

215001–215100 

|-bgcolor=#d6d6d6
| 215001 ||  || — || February 9, 2008 || Kitt Peak || Spacewatch || EOS || align=right | 4.1 km || 
|-id=002 bgcolor=#d6d6d6
| 215002 ||  || — || February 9, 2008 || Catalina || CSS || — || align=right | 3.6 km || 
|-id=003 bgcolor=#d6d6d6
| 215003 ||  || — || February 10, 2008 || Kitt Peak || Spacewatch || — || align=right | 2.9 km || 
|-id=004 bgcolor=#fefefe
| 215004 ||  || — || February 12, 2008 || Kitt Peak || Spacewatch || ERI || align=right | 1.8 km || 
|-id=005 bgcolor=#E9E9E9
| 215005 ||  || — || February 24, 2008 || Mount Lemmon || Mount Lemmon Survey || — || align=right | 1.4 km || 
|-id=006 bgcolor=#d6d6d6
| 215006 ||  || — || February 27, 2008 || Catalina || CSS || EOS || align=right | 2.9 km || 
|-id=007 bgcolor=#d6d6d6
| 215007 ||  || — || February 27, 2008 || Mount Lemmon || Mount Lemmon Survey || — || align=right | 4.2 km || 
|-id=008 bgcolor=#E9E9E9
| 215008 ||  || — || February 28, 2008 || Catalina || CSS || — || align=right | 1.9 km || 
|-id=009 bgcolor=#d6d6d6
| 215009 ||  || — || February 29, 2008 || Catalina || CSS || URS || align=right | 5.7 km || 
|-id=010 bgcolor=#d6d6d6
| 215010 ||  || — || March 2, 2008 || Kitt Peak || Spacewatch || — || align=right | 3.9 km || 
|-id=011 bgcolor=#d6d6d6
| 215011 ||  || — || March 2, 2008 || Mount Lemmon || Mount Lemmon Survey || VER || align=right | 3.6 km || 
|-id=012 bgcolor=#d6d6d6
| 215012 ||  || — || March 5, 2008 || Mount Lemmon || Mount Lemmon Survey || — || align=right | 4.9 km || 
|-id=013 bgcolor=#E9E9E9
| 215013 ||  || — || April 6, 2008 || Socorro || LINEAR || — || align=right | 3.8 km || 
|-id=014 bgcolor=#E9E9E9
| 215014 ||  || — || September 22, 2008 || Sierra Stars || F. Tozzi || — || align=right | 3.5 km || 
|-id=015 bgcolor=#d6d6d6
| 215015 ||  || — || October 7, 2008 || Mount Lemmon || Mount Lemmon Survey || HYG || align=right | 4.7 km || 
|-id=016 bgcolor=#E9E9E9
| 215016 Catherinegriffin ||  ||  || October 21, 2008 || Raheny || D. Grennan || — || align=right | 3.5 km || 
|-id=017 bgcolor=#E9E9E9
| 215017 ||  || — || December 7, 2008 || Mount Lemmon || Mount Lemmon Survey || HNS || align=right | 1.4 km || 
|-id=018 bgcolor=#fefefe
| 215018 ||  || — || December 29, 2008 || Mount Lemmon || Mount Lemmon Survey || — || align=right data-sort-value="0.65" | 650 m || 
|-id=019 bgcolor=#d6d6d6
| 215019 ||  || — || December 30, 2008 || Kitt Peak || Spacewatch || CHA || align=right | 2.9 km || 
|-id=020 bgcolor=#C2FFFF
| 215020 ||  || — || January 25, 2009 || Kitt Peak || Spacewatch || L5 || align=right | 13 km || 
|-id=021 bgcolor=#E9E9E9
| 215021 Fanjingshan ||  ||  || January 26, 2009 || XuYi || PMO NEO || JUN || align=right | 1.4 km || 
|-id=022 bgcolor=#E9E9E9
| 215022 ||  || — || January 29, 2009 || Chante-Perdrix || Chante-Perdrix Obs. || — || align=right | 3.5 km || 
|-id=023 bgcolor=#E9E9E9
| 215023 Huangjiqing ||  ||  || January 27, 2009 || XuYi || PMO NEO || — || align=right | 3.6 km || 
|-id=024 bgcolor=#E9E9E9
| 215024 ||  || — || January 28, 2009 || Catalina || CSS || MAR || align=right | 2.1 km || 
|-id=025 bgcolor=#E9E9E9
| 215025 ||  || — || January 25, 2009 || Kitt Peak || Spacewatch || — || align=right | 1.2 km || 
|-id=026 bgcolor=#d6d6d6
| 215026 ||  || — || January 29, 2009 || Mount Lemmon || Mount Lemmon Survey || — || align=right | 3.3 km || 
|-id=027 bgcolor=#fefefe
| 215027 ||  || — || January 28, 2009 || Catalina || CSS || — || align=right | 1.1 km || 
|-id=028 bgcolor=#fefefe
| 215028 ||  || — || January 31, 2009 || Mount Lemmon || Mount Lemmon Survey || V || align=right data-sort-value="0.77" | 770 m || 
|-id=029 bgcolor=#E9E9E9
| 215029 ||  || — || January 31, 2009 || Mount Lemmon || Mount Lemmon Survey || — || align=right | 3.3 km || 
|-id=030 bgcolor=#d6d6d6
| 215030 ||  || — || January 18, 2009 || Mount Lemmon || Mount Lemmon Survey || HYG || align=right | 3.1 km || 
|-id=031 bgcolor=#fefefe
| 215031 ||  || — || January 20, 2009 || Mount Lemmon || Mount Lemmon Survey || V || align=right | 1.0 km || 
|-id=032 bgcolor=#d6d6d6
| 215032 ||  || — || January 30, 2009 || Mount Lemmon || Mount Lemmon Survey || — || align=right | 4.5 km || 
|-id=033 bgcolor=#d6d6d6
| 215033 ||  || — || February 2, 2009 || Catalina || CSS || 628 || align=right | 3.7 km || 
|-id=034 bgcolor=#fefefe
| 215034 ||  || — || February 2, 2009 || Catalina || CSS || V || align=right data-sort-value="0.85" | 850 m || 
|-id=035 bgcolor=#E9E9E9
| 215035 ||  || — || February 1, 2009 || Kitt Peak || Spacewatch || MRX || align=right | 1.5 km || 
|-id=036 bgcolor=#fefefe
| 215036 ||  || — || February 13, 2009 || Kitt Peak || Spacewatch || — || align=right | 1.1 km || 
|-id=037 bgcolor=#E9E9E9
| 215037 ||  || — || February 13, 2009 || Kitt Peak || Spacewatch || — || align=right | 1.9 km || 
|-id=038 bgcolor=#fefefe
| 215038 ||  || — || February 14, 2009 || Kitt Peak || Spacewatch || MAS || align=right data-sort-value="0.94" | 940 m || 
|-id=039 bgcolor=#E9E9E9
| 215039 ||  || — || February 13, 2009 || OAM || OAM Obs. || — || align=right | 2.1 km || 
|-id=040 bgcolor=#E9E9E9
| 215040 ||  || — || February 14, 2009 || Catalina || CSS || — || align=right | 1.7 km || 
|-id=041 bgcolor=#d6d6d6
| 215041 ||  || — || February 5, 2009 || Mount Lemmon || Mount Lemmon Survey || — || align=right | 3.9 km || 
|-id=042 bgcolor=#fefefe
| 215042 ||  || — || February 19, 2009 || Sierra Stars || F. Tozzi || — || align=right | 1.4 km || 
|-id=043 bgcolor=#fefefe
| 215043 ||  || — || February 19, 2009 || Skylive Obs. || Skylive Obs. || KLI || align=right | 3.1 km || 
|-id=044 bgcolor=#fefefe
| 215044 Joãoalves ||  ||  || February 20, 2009 || Calar Alto || F. Hormuth || MAS || align=right data-sort-value="0.78" | 780 m || 
|-id=045 bgcolor=#fefefe
| 215045 ||  || — || February 17, 2009 || Kitt Peak || Spacewatch || — || align=right data-sort-value="0.82" | 820 m || 
|-id=046 bgcolor=#d6d6d6
| 215046 ||  || — || February 18, 2009 || Socorro || LINEAR || — || align=right | 4.6 km || 
|-id=047 bgcolor=#fefefe
| 215047 ||  || — || February 21, 2009 || OAM || OAM Obs. || — || align=right | 1.2 km || 
|-id=048 bgcolor=#E9E9E9
| 215048 ||  || — || February 20, 2009 || Kitt Peak || Spacewatch || HEN || align=right | 1.4 km || 
|-id=049 bgcolor=#d6d6d6
| 215049 ||  || — || February 20, 2009 || Kitt Peak || Spacewatch || — || align=right | 4.2 km || 
|-id=050 bgcolor=#E9E9E9
| 215050 ||  || — || February 16, 2009 || OAM || OAM Obs. || — || align=right | 1.7 km || 
|-id=051 bgcolor=#fefefe
| 215051 ||  || — || February 18, 2009 || OAM || OAM Obs. || — || align=right | 1.2 km || 
|-id=052 bgcolor=#d6d6d6
| 215052 ||  || — || February 28, 2009 || Socorro || LINEAR || — || align=right | 7.1 km || 
|-id=053 bgcolor=#E9E9E9
| 215053 ||  || — || February 26, 2009 || Calvin-Rehoboth || Calvin–Rehoboth Obs. || — || align=right | 3.7 km || 
|-id=054 bgcolor=#fefefe
| 215054 ||  || — || February 22, 2009 || Kitt Peak || Spacewatch || V || align=right data-sort-value="0.99" | 990 m || 
|-id=055 bgcolor=#fefefe
| 215055 ||  || — || February 26, 2009 || Mount Lemmon || Mount Lemmon Survey || MAS || align=right data-sort-value="0.81" | 810 m || 
|-id=056 bgcolor=#d6d6d6
| 215056 ||  || — || February 21, 2009 || OAM || OAM Obs. || THM || align=right | 3.4 km || 
|-id=057 bgcolor=#fefefe
| 215057 ||  || — || February 24, 2009 || Kitt Peak || Spacewatch || NYS || align=right data-sort-value="0.83" | 830 m || 
|-id=058 bgcolor=#d6d6d6
| 215058 ||  || — || February 28, 2009 || Kitt Peak || Spacewatch || 7:4 || align=right | 7.2 km || 
|-id=059 bgcolor=#E9E9E9
| 215059 ||  || — || February 27, 2009 || Kitt Peak || Spacewatch || — || align=right | 1.8 km || 
|-id=060 bgcolor=#d6d6d6
| 215060 ||  || — || February 27, 2009 || Kitt Peak || Spacewatch || HYG || align=right | 3.7 km || 
|-id=061 bgcolor=#d6d6d6
| 215061 ||  || — || February 19, 2009 || Kitt Peak || Spacewatch || — || align=right | 3.0 km || 
|-id=062 bgcolor=#E9E9E9
| 215062 ||  || — || February 19, 2009 || Kitt Peak || Spacewatch || — || align=right | 2.9 km || 
|-id=063 bgcolor=#fefefe
| 215063 ||  || — || February 19, 2009 || Kitt Peak || Spacewatch || — || align=right | 1.1 km || 
|-id=064 bgcolor=#E9E9E9
| 215064 ||  || — || February 19, 2009 || Kitt Peak || Spacewatch || — || align=right | 1.3 km || 
|-id=065 bgcolor=#fefefe
| 215065 ||  || — || February 20, 2009 || Kitt Peak || Spacewatch || NYS || align=right | 1.2 km || 
|-id=066 bgcolor=#fefefe
| 215066 ||  || — || February 20, 2009 || Kitt Peak || Spacewatch || — || align=right | 1.2 km || 
|-id=067 bgcolor=#E9E9E9
| 215067 ||  || — || February 20, 2009 || Kitt Peak || Spacewatch || — || align=right | 2.7 km || 
|-id=068 bgcolor=#d6d6d6
| 215068 ||  || — || February 27, 2009 || Kitt Peak || Spacewatch || — || align=right | 3.8 km || 
|-id=069 bgcolor=#E9E9E9
| 215069 ||  || — || February 27, 2009 || Kitt Peak || Spacewatch || — || align=right | 2.3 km || 
|-id=070 bgcolor=#fefefe
| 215070 ||  || — || February 27, 2009 || Kitt Peak || Spacewatch || — || align=right data-sort-value="0.80" | 800 m || 
|-id=071 bgcolor=#fefefe
| 215071 ||  || — || March 15, 2009 || OAM || OAM Obs. || — || align=right | 1.3 km || 
|-id=072 bgcolor=#fefefe
| 215072 ||  || — || March 2, 2009 || Kitt Peak || Spacewatch || ERI || align=right | 1.9 km || 
|-id=073 bgcolor=#E9E9E9
| 215073 ||  || — || March 15, 2009 || OAM || OAM Obs. || — || align=right | 2.8 km || 
|-id=074 bgcolor=#d6d6d6
| 215074 ||  || — || March 15, 2009 || Kitt Peak || Spacewatch || — || align=right | 3.3 km || 
|-id=075 bgcolor=#fefefe
| 215075 ||  || — || March 15, 2009 || Kitt Peak || Spacewatch || NYS || align=right data-sort-value="0.82" | 820 m || 
|-id=076 bgcolor=#E9E9E9
| 215076 ||  || — || March 17, 2009 || OAM || OAM Obs. || PAD || align=right | 2.1 km || 
|-id=077 bgcolor=#E9E9E9
| 215077 ||  || — || March 17, 2009 || Kitt Peak || Spacewatch || — || align=right | 1.7 km || 
|-id=078 bgcolor=#fefefe
| 215078 ||  || — || March 19, 2009 || OAM || OAM Obs. || NYS || align=right | 2.4 km || 
|-id=079 bgcolor=#d6d6d6
| 215079 ||  || — || March 19, 2009 || OAM || OAM Obs. || EOS || align=right | 2.6 km || 
|-id=080 bgcolor=#E9E9E9
| 215080 Kaohsiung ||  ||  || March 20, 2009 || Lulin Observatory || Y.-S. Tsai, C.-S. Lin || HNA || align=right | 2.4 km || 
|-id=081 bgcolor=#fefefe
| 215081 ||  || — || March 17, 2009 || Catalina || CSS || — || align=right | 1.9 km || 
|-id=082 bgcolor=#fefefe
| 215082 ||  || — || March 19, 2009 || Mount Lemmon || Mount Lemmon Survey || — || align=right | 1.1 km || 
|-id=083 bgcolor=#d6d6d6
| 215083 ||  || — || March 21, 2009 || Kitt Peak || Spacewatch || — || align=right | 3.1 km || 
|-id=084 bgcolor=#E9E9E9
| 215084 ||  || — || March 25, 2009 || Mayhill || A. Lowe || — || align=right | 1.6 km || 
|-id=085 bgcolor=#E9E9E9
| 215085 ||  || — || March 21, 2009 || Catalina || CSS || — || align=right | 3.0 km || 
|-id=086 bgcolor=#d6d6d6
| 215086 ||  || — || March 29, 2009 || Kachina || Kachina Obs. || URS || align=right | 5.5 km || 
|-id=087 bgcolor=#d6d6d6
| 215087 ||  || — || March 30, 2009 || Sierra Stars || F. Tozzi || — || align=right | 5.5 km || 
|-id=088 bgcolor=#d6d6d6
| 215088 ||  || — || September 24, 1960 || Palomar || PLS || — || align=right | 6.3 km || 
|-id=089 bgcolor=#d6d6d6
| 215089 Hermanfrid ||  ||  || September 24, 1960 || Palomar || PLS || SHU3:2 || align=right | 8.1 km || 
|-id=090 bgcolor=#fefefe
| 215090 ||  || — || September 24, 1960 || Palomar || PLS || — || align=right data-sort-value="0.98" | 980 m || 
|-id=091 bgcolor=#fefefe
| 215091 ||  || — || September 24, 1960 || Palomar || PLS || — || align=right | 1.1 km || 
|-id=092 bgcolor=#E9E9E9
| 215092 ||  || — || September 24, 1960 || Palomar || PLS || — || align=right | 1.3 km || 
|-id=093 bgcolor=#fefefe
| 215093 ||  || — || September 24, 1960 || Palomar || PLS || MAS || align=right | 1.1 km || 
|-id=094 bgcolor=#E9E9E9
| 215094 ||  || — || September 25, 1973 || Palomar || PLS || — || align=right | 5.8 km || 
|-id=095 bgcolor=#d6d6d6
| 215095 ||  || — || October 16, 1977 || Palomar || PLS || — || align=right | 6.2 km || 
|-id=096 bgcolor=#fefefe
| 215096 ||  || — || October 16, 1977 || Palomar || PLS || NYS || align=right data-sort-value="0.90" | 900 m || 
|-id=097 bgcolor=#fefefe
| 215097 ||  || — || October 16, 1977 || Palomar || PLS || — || align=right | 1.2 km || 
|-id=098 bgcolor=#fefefe
| 215098 ||  || — || October 16, 1977 || Palomar || PLS || — || align=right | 1.3 km || 
|-id=099 bgcolor=#E9E9E9
| 215099 ||  || — || March 7, 1981 || Siding Spring || S. J. Bus || — || align=right | 3.1 km || 
|-id=100 bgcolor=#fefefe
| 215100 ||  || — || September 2, 1992 || Siding Spring || R. H. McNaught || — || align=right | 3.7 km || 
|}

215101–215200 

|-bgcolor=#fefefe
| 215101 ||  || — || June 1, 1995 || Siding Spring || R. H. McNaught || H || align=right | 1.1 km || 
|-id=102 bgcolor=#E9E9E9
| 215102 ||  || — || July 24, 1995 || Kitt Peak || Spacewatch || — || align=right | 1.8 km || 
|-id=103 bgcolor=#d6d6d6
| 215103 ||  || — || October 17, 1995 || Kitt Peak || Spacewatch || — || align=right | 4.4 km || 
|-id=104 bgcolor=#fefefe
| 215104 ||  || — || October 18, 1995 || Kitt Peak || Spacewatch || — || align=right | 1.3 km || 
|-id=105 bgcolor=#fefefe
| 215105 ||  || — || October 23, 1995 || Kitt Peak || Spacewatch || NYS || align=right | 1.2 km || 
|-id=106 bgcolor=#fefefe
| 215106 ||  || — || November 14, 1995 || Kitt Peak || Spacewatch || MAS || align=right | 1.0 km || 
|-id=107 bgcolor=#C2FFFF
| 215107 ||  || — || September 13, 1996 || Kitt Peak || Spacewatch || L4 || align=right | 13 km || 
|-id=108 bgcolor=#fefefe
| 215108 ||  || — || September 14, 1996 || Kitt Peak || Spacewatch || — || align=right | 1.3 km || 
|-id=109 bgcolor=#fefefe
| 215109 ||  || — || November 5, 1996 || Kitt Peak || Spacewatch || — || align=right data-sort-value="0.91" | 910 m || 
|-id=110 bgcolor=#C2FFFF
| 215110 ||  || — || July 5, 1997 || Kitt Peak || Spacewatch || L5 || align=right | 16 km || 
|-id=111 bgcolor=#E9E9E9
| 215111 ||  || — || November 21, 1997 || Kitt Peak || Spacewatch || WIT || align=right | 1.2 km || 
|-id=112 bgcolor=#E9E9E9
| 215112 ||  || — || December 6, 1997 || Caussols || ODAS || — || align=right | 3.1 km || 
|-id=113 bgcolor=#d6d6d6
| 215113 ||  || — || February 21, 1998 || Modra || A. Galád, A. Pravda || — || align=right | 2.5 km || 
|-id=114 bgcolor=#fefefe
| 215114 ||  || — || February 21, 1998 || Xinglong || SCAP || — || align=right | 1.0 km || 
|-id=115 bgcolor=#fefefe
| 215115 ||  || — || March 2, 1998 || Caussols || ODAS || V || align=right data-sort-value="0.72" | 720 m || 
|-id=116 bgcolor=#fefefe
| 215116 ||  || — || June 26, 1998 || La Silla || E. W. Elst || — || align=right | 1.4 km || 
|-id=117 bgcolor=#fefefe
| 215117 ||  || — || September 13, 1998 || Kitt Peak || Spacewatch || FLO || align=right data-sort-value="0.95" | 950 m || 
|-id=118 bgcolor=#E9E9E9
| 215118 ||  || — || October 13, 1998 || Kitt Peak || Spacewatch || — || align=right | 1.0 km || 
|-id=119 bgcolor=#E9E9E9
| 215119 ||  || — || November 21, 1998 || Kitt Peak || Spacewatch || — || align=right | 1.4 km || 
|-id=120 bgcolor=#FA8072
| 215120 ||  || — || May 10, 1999 || Socorro || LINEAR || — || align=right | 1.3 km || 
|-id=121 bgcolor=#FA8072
| 215121 ||  || — || May 14, 1999 || Socorro || LINEAR || — || align=right data-sort-value="0.63" | 630 m || 
|-id=122 bgcolor=#FA8072
| 215122 ||  || — || June 9, 1999 || Socorro || LINEAR || — || align=right | 1.7 km || 
|-id=123 bgcolor=#fefefe
| 215123 ||  || — || September 15, 1999 || Klet || Kleť Obs. || H || align=right data-sort-value="0.76" | 760 m || 
|-id=124 bgcolor=#d6d6d6
| 215124 ||  || — || September 13, 1999 || Socorro || LINEAR || — || align=right | 3.2 km || 
|-id=125 bgcolor=#fefefe
| 215125 ||  || — || September 7, 1999 || Socorro || LINEAR || — || align=right | 1.0 km || 
|-id=126 bgcolor=#d6d6d6
| 215126 ||  || — || September 9, 1999 || Socorro || LINEAR || — || align=right | 2.5 km || 
|-id=127 bgcolor=#fefefe
| 215127 ||  || — || September 9, 1999 || Socorro || LINEAR || — || align=right | 1.2 km || 
|-id=128 bgcolor=#E9E9E9
| 215128 ||  || — || September 9, 1999 || Socorro || LINEAR || EUN || align=right | 1.8 km || 
|-id=129 bgcolor=#fefefe
| 215129 ||  || — || September 9, 1999 || Socorro || LINEAR || V || align=right | 1.0 km || 
|-id=130 bgcolor=#d6d6d6
| 215130 ||  || — || September 10, 1999 || Socorro || LINEAR || MEL || align=right | 7.0 km || 
|-id=131 bgcolor=#fefefe
| 215131 ||  || — || September 8, 1999 || Catalina || CSS || ERI || align=right | 2.3 km || 
|-id=132 bgcolor=#fefefe
| 215132 ||  || — || October 3, 1999 || Socorro || LINEAR || H || align=right data-sort-value="0.82" | 820 m || 
|-id=133 bgcolor=#d6d6d6
| 215133 ||  || — || October 4, 1999 || Socorro || LINEAR || LIX || align=right | 5.4 km || 
|-id=134 bgcolor=#d6d6d6
| 215134 ||  || — || October 8, 1999 || Kitt Peak || Spacewatch || — || align=right | 3.3 km || 
|-id=135 bgcolor=#fefefe
| 215135 ||  || — || October 4, 1999 || Socorro || LINEAR || — || align=right | 1.3 km || 
|-id=136 bgcolor=#fefefe
| 215136 ||  || — || October 9, 1999 || Socorro || LINEAR || ERI || align=right | 2.0 km || 
|-id=137 bgcolor=#fefefe
| 215137 ||  || — || October 10, 1999 || Socorro || LINEAR || NYS || align=right | 1.0 km || 
|-id=138 bgcolor=#fefefe
| 215138 ||  || — || October 13, 1999 || Socorro || LINEAR || — || align=right | 1.5 km || 
|-id=139 bgcolor=#d6d6d6
| 215139 ||  || — || October 15, 1999 || Socorro || LINEAR || HYG || align=right | 4.6 km || 
|-id=140 bgcolor=#fefefe
| 215140 ||  || — || October 11, 1999 || Kitt Peak || Spacewatch || — || align=right | 1.1 km || 
|-id=141 bgcolor=#d6d6d6
| 215141 ||  || — || October 8, 1999 || Socorro || LINEAR || LUT || align=right | 5.7 km || 
|-id=142 bgcolor=#d6d6d6
| 215142 ||  || — || October 31, 1999 || Kitt Peak || Spacewatch || — || align=right | 3.3 km || 
|-id=143 bgcolor=#fefefe
| 215143 ||  || — || October 30, 1999 || Catalina || CSS || — || align=right | 1.3 km || 
|-id=144 bgcolor=#FA8072
| 215144 ||  || — || October 31, 1999 || Catalina || CSS || PHO || align=right | 1.5 km || 
|-id=145 bgcolor=#fefefe
| 215145 ||  || — || October 29, 1999 || Kitt Peak || Spacewatch || NYS || align=right data-sort-value="0.73" | 730 m || 
|-id=146 bgcolor=#fefefe
| 215146 ||  || — || November 3, 1999 || Socorro || LINEAR || — || align=right | 1.7 km || 
|-id=147 bgcolor=#fefefe
| 215147 ||  || — || November 4, 1999 || Socorro || LINEAR || V || align=right data-sort-value="0.94" | 940 m || 
|-id=148 bgcolor=#fefefe
| 215148 ||  || — || November 4, 1999 || Socorro || LINEAR || — || align=right | 1.4 km || 
|-id=149 bgcolor=#d6d6d6
| 215149 ||  || — || November 9, 1999 || Catalina || CSS || EUP || align=right | 6.2 km || 
|-id=150 bgcolor=#fefefe
| 215150 ||  || — || November 9, 1999 || Kitt Peak || Spacewatch || NYS || align=right data-sort-value="0.68" | 680 m || 
|-id=151 bgcolor=#d6d6d6
| 215151 ||  || — || November 14, 1999 || Socorro || LINEAR || TIR || align=right | 2.5 km || 
|-id=152 bgcolor=#fefefe
| 215152 ||  || — || November 5, 1999 || Anderson Mesa || LONEOS || H || align=right data-sort-value="0.97" | 970 m || 
|-id=153 bgcolor=#E9E9E9
| 215153 ||  || — || November 3, 1999 || Socorro || LINEAR || — || align=right | 5.3 km || 
|-id=154 bgcolor=#fefefe
| 215154 ||  || — || December 2, 1999 || Kitt Peak || Spacewatch || — || align=right data-sort-value="0.87" | 870 m || 
|-id=155 bgcolor=#fefefe
| 215155 ||  || — || December 7, 1999 || Kitt Peak || Spacewatch || — || align=right data-sort-value="0.97" | 970 m || 
|-id=156 bgcolor=#E9E9E9
| 215156 ||  || — || December 13, 1999 || Kitt Peak || Spacewatch || EUN || align=right | 1.7 km || 
|-id=157 bgcolor=#fefefe
| 215157 ||  || — || December 9, 1999 || Kitt Peak || Spacewatch || — || align=right data-sort-value="0.99" | 990 m || 
|-id=158 bgcolor=#d6d6d6
| 215158 ||  || — || January 4, 2000 || Socorro || LINEAR || — || align=right | 5.0 km || 
|-id=159 bgcolor=#E9E9E9
| 215159 ||  || — || January 5, 2000 || Socorro || LINEAR || — || align=right | 2.5 km || 
|-id=160 bgcolor=#fefefe
| 215160 ||  || — || January 5, 2000 || Socorro || LINEAR || — || align=right | 2.2 km || 
|-id=161 bgcolor=#E9E9E9
| 215161 ||  || — || January 7, 2000 || Socorro || LINEAR || — || align=right | 1.8 km || 
|-id=162 bgcolor=#E9E9E9
| 215162 ||  || — || January 21, 2000 || Socorro || LINEAR || GER || align=right | 2.6 km || 
|-id=163 bgcolor=#d6d6d6
| 215163 ||  || — || January 26, 2000 || Kitt Peak || Spacewatch || EOS || align=right | 3.3 km || 
|-id=164 bgcolor=#E9E9E9
| 215164 ||  || — || February 2, 2000 || Socorro || LINEAR || — || align=right | 2.4 km || 
|-id=165 bgcolor=#E9E9E9
| 215165 ||  || — || February 2, 2000 || Socorro || LINEAR || — || align=right | 3.5 km || 
|-id=166 bgcolor=#E9E9E9
| 215166 ||  || — || February 1, 2000 || Catalina || CSS || — || align=right | 1.8 km || 
|-id=167 bgcolor=#FFC2E0
| 215167 ||  || — || March 5, 2000 || Socorro || LINEAR || AMO || align=right data-sort-value="0.69" | 690 m || 
|-id=168 bgcolor=#E9E9E9
| 215168 ||  || — || March 5, 2000 || Socorro || LINEAR || ADE || align=right | 4.3 km || 
|-id=169 bgcolor=#E9E9E9
| 215169 ||  || — || March 9, 2000 || Socorro || LINEAR || — || align=right | 2.3 km || 
|-id=170 bgcolor=#E9E9E9
| 215170 ||  || — || March 30, 2000 || Kitt Peak || Spacewatch || — || align=right | 2.5 km || 
|-id=171 bgcolor=#E9E9E9
| 215171 ||  || — || March 29, 2000 || Socorro || LINEAR || — || align=right | 3.0 km || 
|-id=172 bgcolor=#E9E9E9
| 215172 ||  || — || April 5, 2000 || Socorro || LINEAR || — || align=right | 3.3 km || 
|-id=173 bgcolor=#E9E9E9
| 215173 ||  || — || April 5, 2000 || Socorro || LINEAR || EUN || align=right | 2.8 km || 
|-id=174 bgcolor=#E9E9E9
| 215174 ||  || — || April 7, 2000 || Socorro || LINEAR || — || align=right | 2.2 km || 
|-id=175 bgcolor=#E9E9E9
| 215175 ||  || — || April 2, 2000 || Kitt Peak || Spacewatch || — || align=right | 2.8 km || 
|-id=176 bgcolor=#E9E9E9
| 215176 ||  || — || April 5, 2000 || Kitt Peak || Spacewatch || MIS || align=right | 3.2 km || 
|-id=177 bgcolor=#E9E9E9
| 215177 ||  || — || April 10, 2000 || Socorro || LINEAR || — || align=right | 2.3 km || 
|-id=178 bgcolor=#E9E9E9
| 215178 ||  || — || April 5, 2000 || Socorro || LINEAR || — || align=right | 2.4 km || 
|-id=179 bgcolor=#E9E9E9
| 215179 ||  || — || April 5, 2000 || Anderson Mesa || LONEOS || — || align=right | 2.3 km || 
|-id=180 bgcolor=#E9E9E9
| 215180 ||  || — || April 25, 2000 || Kitt Peak || Spacewatch || — || align=right | 2.5 km || 
|-id=181 bgcolor=#E9E9E9
| 215181 ||  || — || April 26, 2000 || Kitt Peak || Spacewatch || — || align=right | 2.6 km || 
|-id=182 bgcolor=#E9E9E9
| 215182 ||  || — || April 27, 2000 || Kitt Peak || Spacewatch || GEF || align=right | 1.8 km || 
|-id=183 bgcolor=#E9E9E9
| 215183 ||  || — || April 29, 2000 || Socorro || LINEAR || — || align=right | 2.0 km || 
|-id=184 bgcolor=#E9E9E9
| 215184 ||  || — || April 27, 2000 || Anderson Mesa || LONEOS || JUN || align=right | 1.6 km || 
|-id=185 bgcolor=#E9E9E9
| 215185 ||  || — || May 7, 2000 || Socorro || LINEAR || — || align=right | 2.9 km || 
|-id=186 bgcolor=#E9E9E9
| 215186 ||  || — || May 24, 2000 || Kitt Peak || Spacewatch || — || align=right | 4.0 km || 
|-id=187 bgcolor=#E9E9E9
| 215187 ||  || — || June 7, 2000 || Socorro || LINEAR || — || align=right | 3.9 km || 
|-id=188 bgcolor=#FFC2E0
| 215188 ||  || — || July 2, 2000 || Fitchburg || L. L. Amburgey || APO +1km || align=right | 2.9 km || 
|-id=189 bgcolor=#FA8072
| 215189 ||  || — || July 6, 2000 || Anderson Mesa || LONEOS || — || align=right data-sort-value="0.93" | 930 m || 
|-id=190 bgcolor=#fefefe
| 215190 ||  || — || August 3, 2000 || Bisei SG Center || BATTeRS || — || align=right | 1.6 km || 
|-id=191 bgcolor=#fefefe
| 215191 ||  || — || August 24, 2000 || Socorro || LINEAR || — || align=right | 1.3 km || 
|-id=192 bgcolor=#d6d6d6
| 215192 ||  || — || August 31, 2000 || Socorro || LINEAR || — || align=right | 4.3 km || 
|-id=193 bgcolor=#fefefe
| 215193 ||  || — || August 31, 2000 || Socorro || LINEAR || — || align=right | 1.3 km || 
|-id=194 bgcolor=#fefefe
| 215194 ||  || — || September 23, 2000 || Socorro || LINEAR || — || align=right | 1.2 km || 
|-id=195 bgcolor=#E9E9E9
| 215195 ||  || — || September 24, 2000 || Socorro || LINEAR || — || align=right | 4.7 km || 
|-id=196 bgcolor=#fefefe
| 215196 ||  || — || September 24, 2000 || Socorro || LINEAR || — || align=right | 1.3 km || 
|-id=197 bgcolor=#FA8072
| 215197 ||  || — || September 24, 2000 || Socorro || LINEAR || — || align=right data-sort-value="0.57" | 570 m || 
|-id=198 bgcolor=#fefefe
| 215198 ||  || — || September 24, 2000 || Socorro || LINEAR || — || align=right data-sort-value="0.87" | 870 m || 
|-id=199 bgcolor=#C2FFFF
| 215199 ||  || — || September 22, 2000 || Socorro || LINEAR || L5 || align=right | 19 km || 
|-id=200 bgcolor=#d6d6d6
| 215200 ||  || — || September 23, 2000 || Socorro || LINEAR || EOS || align=right | 3.4 km || 
|}

215201–215300 

|-bgcolor=#d6d6d6
| 215201 ||  || — || September 23, 2000 || Socorro || LINEAR || EOS || align=right | 3.3 km || 
|-id=202 bgcolor=#E9E9E9
| 215202 ||  || — || September 22, 2000 || Socorro || LINEAR || — || align=right | 3.2 km || 
|-id=203 bgcolor=#fefefe
| 215203 ||  || — || September 24, 2000 || Socorro || LINEAR || — || align=right data-sort-value="0.87" | 870 m || 
|-id=204 bgcolor=#fefefe
| 215204 ||  || — || September 24, 2000 || Socorro || LINEAR || — || align=right data-sort-value="0.86" | 860 m || 
|-id=205 bgcolor=#d6d6d6
| 215205 ||  || — || September 27, 2000 || Socorro || LINEAR || — || align=right | 4.2 km || 
|-id=206 bgcolor=#fefefe
| 215206 ||  || — || September 24, 2000 || Socorro || LINEAR || — || align=right data-sort-value="0.82" | 820 m || 
|-id=207 bgcolor=#fefefe
| 215207 ||  || — || September 27, 2000 || Socorro || LINEAR || FLO || align=right | 1.1 km || 
|-id=208 bgcolor=#d6d6d6
| 215208 ||  || — || September 28, 2000 || Socorro || LINEAR || — || align=right | 3.8 km || 
|-id=209 bgcolor=#E9E9E9
| 215209 ||  || — || September 25, 2000 || Haleakala || NEAT || TIN || align=right | 1.9 km || 
|-id=210 bgcolor=#d6d6d6
| 215210 ||  || — || September 29, 2000 || Anderson Mesa || LONEOS || — || align=right | 5.2 km || 
|-id=211 bgcolor=#E9E9E9
| 215211 ||  || — || September 29, 2000 || Anderson Mesa || LONEOS || — || align=right | 4.8 km || 
|-id=212 bgcolor=#E9E9E9
| 215212 ||  || — || October 1, 2000 || Socorro || LINEAR || — || align=right | 3.1 km || 
|-id=213 bgcolor=#d6d6d6
| 215213 ||  || — || October 1, 2000 || Socorro || LINEAR || EOS || align=right | 2.6 km || 
|-id=214 bgcolor=#d6d6d6
| 215214 ||  || — || October 1, 2000 || Socorro || LINEAR || — || align=right | 4.6 km || 
|-id=215 bgcolor=#fefefe
| 215215 ||  || — || October 6, 2000 || Anderson Mesa || LONEOS || — || align=right | 1.2 km || 
|-id=216 bgcolor=#fefefe
| 215216 ||  || — || October 24, 2000 || Socorro || LINEAR || — || align=right | 1.7 km || 
|-id=217 bgcolor=#fefefe
| 215217 ||  || — || October 30, 2000 || Oaxaca || J. M. Roe || FLO || align=right data-sort-value="0.98" | 980 m || 
|-id=218 bgcolor=#d6d6d6
| 215218 ||  || — || October 24, 2000 || Socorro || LINEAR || — || align=right | 4.2 km || 
|-id=219 bgcolor=#d6d6d6
| 215219 ||  || — || October 24, 2000 || Socorro || LINEAR || — || align=right | 3.4 km || 
|-id=220 bgcolor=#fefefe
| 215220 ||  || — || November 1, 2000 || Socorro || LINEAR || — || align=right | 1.9 km || 
|-id=221 bgcolor=#fefefe
| 215221 ||  || — || November 21, 2000 || Socorro || LINEAR || FLO || align=right | 1.2 km || 
|-id=222 bgcolor=#d6d6d6
| 215222 ||  || — || November 20, 2000 || Socorro || LINEAR || — || align=right | 6.5 km || 
|-id=223 bgcolor=#d6d6d6
| 215223 ||  || — || November 17, 2000 || Kitt Peak || Spacewatch || — || align=right | 4.8 km || 
|-id=224 bgcolor=#fefefe
| 215224 ||  || — || November 20, 2000 || Anderson Mesa || LONEOS || — || align=right | 1.4 km || 
|-id=225 bgcolor=#fefefe
| 215225 ||  || — || November 21, 2000 || Socorro || LINEAR || NYS || align=right data-sort-value="0.96" | 960 m || 
|-id=226 bgcolor=#d6d6d6
| 215226 ||  || — || November 20, 2000 || Anderson Mesa || LONEOS || — || align=right | 5.7 km || 
|-id=227 bgcolor=#d6d6d6
| 215227 ||  || — || November 25, 2000 || Socorro || LINEAR || TIR || align=right | 4.4 km || 
|-id=228 bgcolor=#fefefe
| 215228 ||  || — || December 20, 2000 || Kitt Peak || Spacewatch || MAS || align=right data-sort-value="0.99" | 990 m || 
|-id=229 bgcolor=#fefefe
| 215229 ||  || — || December 30, 2000 || Socorro || LINEAR || ERI || align=right | 2.1 km || 
|-id=230 bgcolor=#fefefe
| 215230 ||  || — || December 30, 2000 || Socorro || LINEAR || FLO || align=right | 1.1 km || 
|-id=231 bgcolor=#fefefe
| 215231 ||  || — || January 2, 2001 || Socorro || LINEAR || NYS || align=right data-sort-value="0.99" | 990 m || 
|-id=232 bgcolor=#E9E9E9
| 215232 ||  || — || January 2, 2001 || Socorro || LINEAR || — || align=right | 5.2 km || 
|-id=233 bgcolor=#fefefe
| 215233 ||  || — || January 3, 2001 || Socorro || LINEAR || V || align=right data-sort-value="0.99" | 990 m || 
|-id=234 bgcolor=#fefefe
| 215234 ||  || — || January 4, 2001 || Socorro || LINEAR || PHO || align=right | 1.6 km || 
|-id=235 bgcolor=#E9E9E9
| 215235 ||  || — || January 20, 2001 || Socorro || LINEAR || — || align=right | 1.8 km || 
|-id=236 bgcolor=#fefefe
| 215236 ||  || — || January 26, 2001 || Kitt Peak || Spacewatch || V || align=right | 1.1 km || 
|-id=237 bgcolor=#E9E9E9
| 215237 ||  || — || February 16, 2001 || Kitt Peak || Spacewatch || — || align=right | 4.0 km || 
|-id=238 bgcolor=#fefefe
| 215238 ||  || — || February 19, 2001 || Socorro || LINEAR || FLO || align=right | 1.0 km || 
|-id=239 bgcolor=#fefefe
| 215239 ||  || — || February 16, 2001 || Socorro || LINEAR || ERI || align=right | 3.5 km || 
|-id=240 bgcolor=#E9E9E9
| 215240 ||  || — || February 17, 2001 || Socorro || LINEAR || MIT || align=right | 4.8 km || 
|-id=241 bgcolor=#fefefe
| 215241 ||  || — || February 19, 2001 || Socorro || LINEAR || — || align=right | 1.2 km || 
|-id=242 bgcolor=#fefefe
| 215242 ||  || — || February 19, 2001 || Socorro || LINEAR || — || align=right | 3.1 km || 
|-id=243 bgcolor=#C2FFFF
| 215243 ||  || — || February 17, 2001 || Socorro || LINEAR || L4 || align=right | 15 km || 
|-id=244 bgcolor=#fefefe
| 215244 ||  || — || March 15, 2001 || Socorro || LINEAR || — || align=right | 3.7 km || 
|-id=245 bgcolor=#fefefe
| 215245 ||  || — || March 20, 2001 || Kitt Peak || Spacewatch || — || align=right | 1.0 km || 
|-id=246 bgcolor=#E9E9E9
| 215246 ||  || — || April 13, 2001 || Kitt Peak || Spacewatch || — || align=right | 1.0 km || 
|-id=247 bgcolor=#E9E9E9
| 215247 ||  || — || May 20, 2001 || Bergisch Gladbach || W. Bickel || — || align=right | 1.5 km || 
|-id=248 bgcolor=#E9E9E9
| 215248 ||  || — || May 18, 2001 || Socorro || LINEAR || — || align=right | 1.4 km || 
|-id=249 bgcolor=#E9E9E9
| 215249 ||  || — || May 26, 2001 || Socorro || LINEAR || EUN || align=right | 2.1 km || 
|-id=250 bgcolor=#FA8072
| 215250 ||  || — || May 18, 2001 || Anderson Mesa || LONEOS || — || align=right | 2.2 km || 
|-id=251 bgcolor=#E9E9E9
| 215251 ||  || — || June 13, 2001 || Anderson Mesa || LONEOS || — || align=right | 2.4 km || 
|-id=252 bgcolor=#E9E9E9
| 215252 ||  || — || June 21, 2001 || Palomar || NEAT || — || align=right | 2.9 km || 
|-id=253 bgcolor=#E9E9E9
| 215253 ||  || — || June 22, 2001 || Palomar || NEAT || — || align=right | 1.9 km || 
|-id=254 bgcolor=#E9E9E9
| 215254 ||  || — || June 21, 2001 || Socorro || LINEAR || — || align=right | 1.6 km || 
|-id=255 bgcolor=#E9E9E9
| 215255 ||  || — || July 11, 2001 || Socorro || LINEAR || BAR || align=right | 3.4 km || 
|-id=256 bgcolor=#E9E9E9
| 215256 ||  || — || July 13, 2001 || Palomar || NEAT || — || align=right | 3.7 km || 
|-id=257 bgcolor=#E9E9E9
| 215257 ||  || — || July 15, 2001 || Haleakala || NEAT || — || align=right | 3.2 km || 
|-id=258 bgcolor=#E9E9E9
| 215258 ||  || — || July 14, 2001 || Palomar || NEAT || — || align=right | 2.8 km || 
|-id=259 bgcolor=#E9E9E9
| 215259 ||  || — || July 16, 2001 || Haleakala || NEAT || — || align=right | 3.5 km || 
|-id=260 bgcolor=#E9E9E9
| 215260 ||  || — || July 16, 2001 || Anderson Mesa || LONEOS || — || align=right | 2.5 km || 
|-id=261 bgcolor=#E9E9E9
| 215261 ||  || — || July 20, 2001 || Socorro || LINEAR || JUN || align=right | 1.7 km || 
|-id=262 bgcolor=#E9E9E9
| 215262 ||  || — || July 20, 2001 || Palomar || NEAT || — || align=right | 3.5 km || 
|-id=263 bgcolor=#FA8072
| 215263 ||  || — || July 16, 2001 || Socorro || LINEAR || — || align=right | 2.1 km || 
|-id=264 bgcolor=#E9E9E9
| 215264 ||  || — || July 19, 2001 || Palomar || NEAT || EUN || align=right | 1.8 km || 
|-id=265 bgcolor=#E9E9E9
| 215265 ||  || — || July 22, 2001 || Palomar || NEAT || — || align=right | 2.9 km || 
|-id=266 bgcolor=#E9E9E9
| 215266 ||  || — || July 19, 2001 || Haleakala || NEAT || JUN || align=right | 1.5 km || 
|-id=267 bgcolor=#E9E9E9
| 215267 ||  || — || July 25, 2001 || Haleakala || NEAT || — || align=right | 2.8 km || 
|-id=268 bgcolor=#E9E9E9
| 215268 ||  || — || July 18, 2001 || Kitt Peak || Spacewatch || — || align=right | 2.1 km || 
|-id=269 bgcolor=#E9E9E9
| 215269 ||  || — || July 29, 2001 || Socorro || LINEAR || GEF || align=right | 2.0 km || 
|-id=270 bgcolor=#d6d6d6
| 215270 ||  || — || July 29, 2001 || Palomar || NEAT || VER || align=right | 5.3 km || 
|-id=271 bgcolor=#E9E9E9
| 215271 ||  || — || July 19, 2001 || Anderson Mesa || LONEOS || — || align=right | 3.0 km || 
|-id=272 bgcolor=#E9E9E9
| 215272 ||  || — || August 9, 2001 || Palomar || NEAT || — || align=right | 3.2 km || 
|-id=273 bgcolor=#E9E9E9
| 215273 ||  || — || August 10, 2001 || Palomar || NEAT || — || align=right | 1.7 km || 
|-id=274 bgcolor=#E9E9E9
| 215274 ||  || — || August 11, 2001 || Palomar || NEAT || — || align=right | 3.4 km || 
|-id=275 bgcolor=#E9E9E9
| 215275 ||  || — || August 14, 2001 || Haleakala || NEAT || — || align=right | 4.3 km || 
|-id=276 bgcolor=#E9E9E9
| 215276 ||  || — || August 17, 2001 || Palomar || NEAT || — || align=right | 1.8 km || 
|-id=277 bgcolor=#E9E9E9
| 215277 ||  || — || August 16, 2001 || Socorro || LINEAR || MIS || align=right | 3.1 km || 
|-id=278 bgcolor=#FA8072
| 215278 ||  || — || August 17, 2001 || Socorro || LINEAR || — || align=right | 1.5 km || 
|-id=279 bgcolor=#E9E9E9
| 215279 ||  || — || August 19, 2001 || Socorro || LINEAR || — || align=right | 2.7 km || 
|-id=280 bgcolor=#E9E9E9
| 215280 ||  || — || August 18, 2001 || Palomar || NEAT || — || align=right | 2.4 km || 
|-id=281 bgcolor=#E9E9E9
| 215281 ||  || — || August 19, 2001 || Socorro || LINEAR || EUN || align=right | 1.6 km || 
|-id=282 bgcolor=#E9E9E9
| 215282 ||  || — || August 24, 2001 || Haleakala || NEAT || MAR || align=right | 2.3 km || 
|-id=283 bgcolor=#E9E9E9
| 215283 ||  || — || August 22, 2001 || Kitt Peak || Spacewatch || — || align=right | 3.4 km || 
|-id=284 bgcolor=#E9E9E9
| 215284 ||  || — || August 23, 2001 || Anderson Mesa || LONEOS || — || align=right | 1.6 km || 
|-id=285 bgcolor=#E9E9E9
| 215285 ||  || — || August 24, 2001 || Socorro || LINEAR || ADE || align=right | 4.0 km || 
|-id=286 bgcolor=#E9E9E9
| 215286 ||  || — || August 25, 2001 || Kitt Peak || Spacewatch || — || align=right | 3.0 km || 
|-id=287 bgcolor=#E9E9E9
| 215287 ||  || — || August 17, 2001 || Socorro || LINEAR || — || align=right | 3.9 km || 
|-id=288 bgcolor=#E9E9E9
| 215288 ||  || — || September 8, 2001 || Anderson Mesa || LONEOS || — || align=right | 2.9 km || 
|-id=289 bgcolor=#E9E9E9
| 215289 ||  || — || September 11, 2001 || Anderson Mesa || LONEOS || — || align=right | 2.3 km || 
|-id=290 bgcolor=#E9E9E9
| 215290 ||  || — || September 12, 2001 || Socorro || LINEAR || — || align=right | 2.1 km || 
|-id=291 bgcolor=#E9E9E9
| 215291 ||  || — || September 12, 2001 || Socorro || LINEAR || — || align=right | 2.4 km || 
|-id=292 bgcolor=#E9E9E9
| 215292 ||  || — || September 12, 2001 || Socorro || LINEAR || EUN || align=right | 1.9 km || 
|-id=293 bgcolor=#E9E9E9
| 215293 ||  || — || September 12, 2001 || Socorro || LINEAR || — || align=right | 2.5 km || 
|-id=294 bgcolor=#fefefe
| 215294 ||  || — || September 12, 2001 || Socorro || LINEAR || FLO || align=right data-sort-value="0.98" | 980 m || 
|-id=295 bgcolor=#E9E9E9
| 215295 ||  || — || September 8, 2001 || Socorro || LINEAR || — || align=right | 2.8 km || 
|-id=296 bgcolor=#E9E9E9
| 215296 ||  || — || September 16, 2001 || Socorro || LINEAR || AGN || align=right | 1.4 km || 
|-id=297 bgcolor=#E9E9E9
| 215297 ||  || — || September 20, 2001 || Socorro || LINEAR || — || align=right | 2.3 km || 
|-id=298 bgcolor=#d6d6d6
| 215298 ||  || — || September 20, 2001 || Socorro || LINEAR || — || align=right | 4.0 km || 
|-id=299 bgcolor=#E9E9E9
| 215299 ||  || — || September 20, 2001 || Desert Eagle || W. K. Y. Yeung || MRX || align=right | 1.7 km || 
|-id=300 bgcolor=#fefefe
| 215300 ||  || — || September 20, 2001 || Desert Eagle || W. K. Y. Yeung || — || align=right | 1.1 km || 
|}

215301–215400 

|-bgcolor=#E9E9E9
| 215301 ||  || — || September 16, 2001 || Socorro || LINEAR || — || align=right | 3.4 km || 
|-id=302 bgcolor=#E9E9E9
| 215302 ||  || — || September 16, 2001 || Socorro || LINEAR || AGN || align=right | 1.8 km || 
|-id=303 bgcolor=#E9E9E9
| 215303 ||  || — || September 16, 2001 || Socorro || LINEAR || — || align=right | 3.2 km || 
|-id=304 bgcolor=#E9E9E9
| 215304 ||  || — || September 17, 2001 || Socorro || LINEAR || — || align=right | 4.4 km || 
|-id=305 bgcolor=#E9E9E9
| 215305 ||  || — || September 17, 2001 || Socorro || LINEAR || — || align=right | 1.9 km || 
|-id=306 bgcolor=#E9E9E9
| 215306 ||  || — || September 16, 2001 || Socorro || LINEAR || — || align=right | 2.0 km || 
|-id=307 bgcolor=#fefefe
| 215307 ||  || — || September 17, 2001 || Socorro || LINEAR || ERI || align=right | 3.1 km || 
|-id=308 bgcolor=#E9E9E9
| 215308 ||  || — || September 19, 2001 || Socorro || LINEAR || — || align=right | 2.3 km || 
|-id=309 bgcolor=#E9E9E9
| 215309 ||  || — || September 19, 2001 || Socorro || LINEAR || — || align=right | 2.6 km || 
|-id=310 bgcolor=#E9E9E9
| 215310 ||  || — || September 19, 2001 || Socorro || LINEAR || HEN || align=right | 1.2 km || 
|-id=311 bgcolor=#E9E9E9
| 215311 ||  || — || September 19, 2001 || Socorro || LINEAR || WIT || align=right | 1.6 km || 
|-id=312 bgcolor=#fefefe
| 215312 ||  || — || September 19, 2001 || Socorro || LINEAR || V || align=right data-sort-value="0.76" | 760 m || 
|-id=313 bgcolor=#d6d6d6
| 215313 ||  || — || September 20, 2001 || Socorro || LINEAR || — || align=right | 3.1 km || 
|-id=314 bgcolor=#E9E9E9
| 215314 ||  || — || September 21, 2001 || Socorro || LINEAR || — || align=right | 3.1 km || 
|-id=315 bgcolor=#E9E9E9
| 215315 ||  || — || September 21, 2001 || Socorro || LINEAR || AST || align=right | 2.7 km || 
|-id=316 bgcolor=#fefefe
| 215316 ||  || — || September 21, 2001 || Palomar || NEAT || V || align=right | 1.2 km || 
|-id=317 bgcolor=#E9E9E9
| 215317 ||  || — || October 13, 2001 || Socorro || LINEAR || — || align=right | 2.1 km || 
|-id=318 bgcolor=#E9E9E9
| 215318 ||  || — || October 14, 2001 || Socorro || LINEAR || HNS || align=right | 2.0 km || 
|-id=319 bgcolor=#C2FFFF
| 215319 ||  || — || October 15, 2001 || Socorro || LINEAR || L5 || align=right | 17 km || 
|-id=320 bgcolor=#E9E9E9
| 215320 ||  || — || October 14, 2001 || Palomar || NEAT || — || align=right | 2.2 km || 
|-id=321 bgcolor=#E9E9E9
| 215321 ||  || — || October 10, 2001 || Palomar || NEAT || — || align=right | 2.0 km || 
|-id=322 bgcolor=#fefefe
| 215322 ||  || — || October 11, 2001 || Palomar || NEAT || FLO || align=right | 1.1 km || 
|-id=323 bgcolor=#E9E9E9
| 215323 ||  || — || October 13, 2001 || Socorro || LINEAR || — || align=right | 3.1 km || 
|-id=324 bgcolor=#E9E9E9
| 215324 ||  || — || October 11, 2001 || Socorro || LINEAR || AGN || align=right | 1.8 km || 
|-id=325 bgcolor=#d6d6d6
| 215325 ||  || — || October 11, 2001 || Socorro || LINEAR || — || align=right | 3.6 km || 
|-id=326 bgcolor=#E9E9E9
| 215326 ||  || — || October 17, 2001 || Kitt Peak || Spacewatch || — || align=right | 3.1 km || 
|-id=327 bgcolor=#E9E9E9
| 215327 ||  || — || October 17, 2001 || Socorro || LINEAR || — || align=right | 4.2 km || 
|-id=328 bgcolor=#d6d6d6
| 215328 ||  || — || October 17, 2001 || Socorro || LINEAR || MEL || align=right | 4.9 km || 
|-id=329 bgcolor=#E9E9E9
| 215329 ||  || — || October 17, 2001 || Socorro || LINEAR || — || align=right | 3.1 km || 
|-id=330 bgcolor=#d6d6d6
| 215330 ||  || — || October 17, 2001 || Socorro || LINEAR || CHA || align=right | 2.4 km || 
|-id=331 bgcolor=#C2FFFF
| 215331 ||  || — || October 17, 2001 || Socorro || LINEAR || L5 || align=right | 11 km || 
|-id=332 bgcolor=#d6d6d6
| 215332 ||  || — || October 22, 2001 || Socorro || LINEAR || KOR || align=right | 2.5 km || 
|-id=333 bgcolor=#d6d6d6
| 215333 ||  || — || October 23, 2001 || Socorro || LINEAR || — || align=right | 5.0 km || 
|-id=334 bgcolor=#E9E9E9
| 215334 ||  || — || October 23, 2001 || Palomar || NEAT || GEF || align=right | 1.6 km || 
|-id=335 bgcolor=#fefefe
| 215335 ||  || — || October 18, 2001 || Palomar || NEAT || NYS || align=right | 1.1 km || 
|-id=336 bgcolor=#E9E9E9
| 215336 ||  || — || October 23, 2001 || Palomar || NEAT || — || align=right | 2.7 km || 
|-id=337 bgcolor=#d6d6d6
| 215337 ||  || — || October 17, 2001 || Kitt Peak || Spacewatch || KOR || align=right | 2.0 km || 
|-id=338 bgcolor=#E9E9E9
| 215338 ||  || — || October 19, 2001 || Palomar || NEAT || — || align=right | 2.8 km || 
|-id=339 bgcolor=#E9E9E9
| 215339 ||  || — || October 19, 2001 || Palomar || NEAT || — || align=right | 2.2 km || 
|-id=340 bgcolor=#C2FFFF
| 215340 ||  || — || October 21, 2001 || Socorro || LINEAR || L5 || align=right | 12 km || 
|-id=341 bgcolor=#d6d6d6
| 215341 ||  || — || October 19, 2001 || Kitt Peak || Spacewatch || TIR || align=right | 3.5 km || 
|-id=342 bgcolor=#E9E9E9
| 215342 ||  || — || October 16, 2001 || Palomar || NEAT || HOF || align=right | 3.4 km || 
|-id=343 bgcolor=#d6d6d6
| 215343 ||  || — || November 9, 2001 || Socorro || LINEAR || KOR || align=right | 1.9 km || 
|-id=344 bgcolor=#E9E9E9
| 215344 ||  || — || November 9, 2001 || Socorro || LINEAR || — || align=right | 4.2 km || 
|-id=345 bgcolor=#d6d6d6
| 215345 ||  || — || November 15, 2001 || Socorro || LINEAR || — || align=right | 4.7 km || 
|-id=346 bgcolor=#d6d6d6
| 215346 ||  || — || November 12, 2001 || Socorro || LINEAR || EOS || align=right | 2.2 km || 
|-id=347 bgcolor=#E9E9E9
| 215347 ||  || — || November 15, 2001 || Palomar || NEAT || PAE || align=right | 3.2 km || 
|-id=348 bgcolor=#d6d6d6
| 215348 ||  || — || November 11, 2001 || Anderson Mesa || LONEOS || EUP || align=right | 7.6 km || 
|-id=349 bgcolor=#C2FFFF
| 215349 ||  || — || November 11, 2001 || Apache Point || SDSS || L5 || align=right | 11 km || 
|-id=350 bgcolor=#E9E9E9
| 215350 ||  || — || November 17, 2001 || Socorro || LINEAR || — || align=right | 4.3 km || 
|-id=351 bgcolor=#E9E9E9
| 215351 ||  || — || November 20, 2001 || Socorro || LINEAR || — || align=right | 3.1 km || 
|-id=352 bgcolor=#fefefe
| 215352 ||  || — || December 14, 2001 || Desert Eagle || W. K. Y. Yeung || — || align=right | 1.3 km || 
|-id=353 bgcolor=#d6d6d6
| 215353 ||  || — || December 10, 2001 || Socorro || LINEAR || — || align=right | 4.3 km || 
|-id=354 bgcolor=#d6d6d6
| 215354 ||  || — || December 14, 2001 || Socorro || LINEAR || — || align=right | 3.9 km || 
|-id=355 bgcolor=#d6d6d6
| 215355 ||  || — || December 14, 2001 || Socorro || LINEAR || EOS || align=right | 2.7 km || 
|-id=356 bgcolor=#d6d6d6
| 215356 ||  || — || December 14, 2001 || Socorro || LINEAR || — || align=right | 3.3 km || 
|-id=357 bgcolor=#d6d6d6
| 215357 ||  || — || December 14, 2001 || Socorro || LINEAR || — || align=right | 4.0 km || 
|-id=358 bgcolor=#d6d6d6
| 215358 ||  || — || December 14, 2001 || Socorro || LINEAR || — || align=right | 4.5 km || 
|-id=359 bgcolor=#d6d6d6
| 215359 ||  || — || December 14, 2001 || Socorro || LINEAR || VER || align=right | 5.2 km || 
|-id=360 bgcolor=#d6d6d6
| 215360 ||  || — || December 14, 2001 || Socorro || LINEAR || — || align=right | 3.6 km || 
|-id=361 bgcolor=#d6d6d6
| 215361 ||  || — || December 14, 2001 || Socorro || LINEAR || HYG || align=right | 3.9 km || 
|-id=362 bgcolor=#E9E9E9
| 215362 ||  || — || December 14, 2001 || Socorro || LINEAR || HNS || align=right | 2.0 km || 
|-id=363 bgcolor=#fefefe
| 215363 ||  || — || December 11, 2001 || Socorro || LINEAR || — || align=right | 1.2 km || 
|-id=364 bgcolor=#d6d6d6
| 215364 ||  || — || December 15, 2001 || Socorro || LINEAR || THM || align=right | 2.7 km || 
|-id=365 bgcolor=#d6d6d6
| 215365 ||  || — || December 14, 2001 || Socorro || LINEAR || — || align=right | 5.1 km || 
|-id=366 bgcolor=#E9E9E9
| 215366 ||  || — || December 5, 2001 || Haleakala || NEAT || — || align=right | 2.7 km || 
|-id=367 bgcolor=#E9E9E9
| 215367 ||  || — || December 7, 2001 || Socorro || LINEAR || — || align=right | 1.9 km || 
|-id=368 bgcolor=#fefefe
| 215368 ||  || — || December 18, 2001 || Socorro || LINEAR || NYS || align=right | 1.1 km || 
|-id=369 bgcolor=#d6d6d6
| 215369 ||  || — || December 18, 2001 || Socorro || LINEAR || — || align=right | 3.4 km || 
|-id=370 bgcolor=#d6d6d6
| 215370 ||  || — || December 18, 2001 || Socorro || LINEAR || — || align=right | 3.3 km || 
|-id=371 bgcolor=#d6d6d6
| 215371 ||  || — || December 17, 2001 || Socorro || LINEAR || — || align=right | 3.0 km || 
|-id=372 bgcolor=#fefefe
| 215372 ||  || — || January 9, 2002 || Socorro || LINEAR || FLO || align=right data-sort-value="0.89" | 890 m || 
|-id=373 bgcolor=#E9E9E9
| 215373 ||  || — || January 9, 2002 || Socorro || LINEAR || — || align=right | 4.6 km || 
|-id=374 bgcolor=#fefefe
| 215374 ||  || — || January 11, 2002 || Socorro || LINEAR || — || align=right | 1.6 km || 
|-id=375 bgcolor=#d6d6d6
| 215375 ||  || — || January 8, 2002 || Socorro || LINEAR || THM || align=right | 3.4 km || 
|-id=376 bgcolor=#d6d6d6
| 215376 ||  || — || January 8, 2002 || Socorro || LINEAR || — || align=right | 3.2 km || 
|-id=377 bgcolor=#d6d6d6
| 215377 ||  || — || January 9, 2002 || Socorro || LINEAR || 3:2 || align=right | 6.0 km || 
|-id=378 bgcolor=#d6d6d6
| 215378 ||  || — || January 9, 2002 || Socorro || LINEAR || — || align=right | 5.5 km || 
|-id=379 bgcolor=#fefefe
| 215379 ||  || — || January 13, 2002 || Socorro || LINEAR || — || align=right data-sort-value="0.88" | 880 m || 
|-id=380 bgcolor=#d6d6d6
| 215380 ||  || — || February 2, 2002 || Haleakala || NEAT || MEL || align=right | 4.9 km || 
|-id=381 bgcolor=#fefefe
| 215381 ||  || — || February 5, 2002 || Palomar || NEAT || — || align=right | 1.3 km || 
|-id=382 bgcolor=#fefefe
| 215382 ||  || — || February 6, 2002 || Socorro || LINEAR || — || align=right | 1.3 km || 
|-id=383 bgcolor=#fefefe
| 215383 ||  || — || February 7, 2002 || Socorro || LINEAR || FLO || align=right | 1.0 km || 
|-id=384 bgcolor=#d6d6d6
| 215384 ||  || — || February 3, 2002 || Haleakala || NEAT || — || align=right | 5.4 km || 
|-id=385 bgcolor=#fefefe
| 215385 ||  || — || February 7, 2002 || Socorro || LINEAR || — || align=right data-sort-value="0.93" | 930 m || 
|-id=386 bgcolor=#fefefe
| 215386 ||  || — || February 6, 2002 || Socorro || LINEAR || — || align=right | 1.0 km || 
|-id=387 bgcolor=#d6d6d6
| 215387 ||  || — || February 7, 2002 || Socorro || LINEAR || — || align=right | 3.7 km || 
|-id=388 bgcolor=#d6d6d6
| 215388 ||  || — || February 7, 2002 || Socorro || LINEAR || — || align=right | 4.0 km || 
|-id=389 bgcolor=#E9E9E9
| 215389 ||  || — || February 7, 2002 || Socorro || LINEAR || NEM || align=right | 3.0 km || 
|-id=390 bgcolor=#d6d6d6
| 215390 ||  || — || February 8, 2002 || Socorro || LINEAR || — || align=right | 4.6 km || 
|-id=391 bgcolor=#fefefe
| 215391 ||  || — || February 9, 2002 || Socorro || LINEAR || — || align=right | 2.5 km || 
|-id=392 bgcolor=#fefefe
| 215392 ||  || — || February 9, 2002 || Socorro || LINEAR || — || align=right | 2.7 km || 
|-id=393 bgcolor=#fefefe
| 215393 ||  || — || February 10, 2002 || Socorro || LINEAR || — || align=right data-sort-value="0.85" | 850 m || 
|-id=394 bgcolor=#d6d6d6
| 215394 ||  || — || February 10, 2002 || Socorro || LINEAR || EOS || align=right | 3.0 km || 
|-id=395 bgcolor=#d6d6d6
| 215395 ||  || — || February 4, 2002 || Palomar || NEAT || — || align=right | 6.7 km || 
|-id=396 bgcolor=#fefefe
| 215396 ||  || — || February 6, 2002 || Palomar || NEAT || FLO || align=right data-sort-value="0.87" | 870 m || 
|-id=397 bgcolor=#d6d6d6
| 215397 ||  || — || February 11, 2002 || Socorro || LINEAR || — || align=right | 5.0 km || 
|-id=398 bgcolor=#fefefe
| 215398 ||  || — || February 23, 2002 || Desert Moon || B. L. Stevens || — || align=right data-sort-value="0.93" | 930 m || 
|-id=399 bgcolor=#fefefe
| 215399 ||  || — || February 20, 2002 || Socorro || LINEAR || — || align=right data-sort-value="0.95" | 950 m || 
|-id=400 bgcolor=#E9E9E9
| 215400 ||  || — || March 5, 2002 || Kitt Peak || Spacewatch || — || align=right | 1.6 km || 
|}

215401–215500 

|-bgcolor=#fefefe
| 215401 ||  || — || March 10, 2002 || Haleakala || NEAT || — || align=right | 1.4 km || 
|-id=402 bgcolor=#fefefe
| 215402 ||  || — || March 12, 2002 || Socorro || LINEAR || — || align=right data-sort-value="0.97" | 970 m || 
|-id=403 bgcolor=#fefefe
| 215403 ||  || — || March 13, 2002 || Socorro || LINEAR || — || align=right | 1.3 km || 
|-id=404 bgcolor=#fefefe
| 215404 ||  || — || March 10, 2002 || Haleakala || NEAT || — || align=right | 1.3 km || 
|-id=405 bgcolor=#fefefe
| 215405 ||  || — || March 9, 2002 || Palomar || NEAT || — || align=right | 1.1 km || 
|-id=406 bgcolor=#fefefe
| 215406 ||  || — || March 9, 2002 || Catalina || CSS || FLO || align=right | 1.1 km || 
|-id=407 bgcolor=#C2FFFF
| 215407 ||  || — || March 10, 2002 || Kitt Peak || Spacewatch || L4 || align=right | 13 km || 
|-id=408 bgcolor=#fefefe
| 215408 ||  || — || March 11, 2002 || Kitt Peak || Spacewatch || — || align=right data-sort-value="0.96" | 960 m || 
|-id=409 bgcolor=#fefefe
| 215409 ||  || — || March 5, 2002 || Anderson Mesa || LONEOS || V || align=right data-sort-value="0.81" | 810 m || 
|-id=410 bgcolor=#fefefe
| 215410 ||  || — || April 4, 2002 || Haleakala || NEAT || H || align=right data-sort-value="0.85" | 850 m || 
|-id=411 bgcolor=#E9E9E9
| 215411 ||  || — || April 15, 2002 || Palomar || NEAT || GEF || align=right | 1.8 km || 
|-id=412 bgcolor=#d6d6d6
| 215412 ||  || — || April 4, 2002 || Haleakala || NEAT || — || align=right | 5.0 km || 
|-id=413 bgcolor=#E9E9E9
| 215413 ||  || — || April 5, 2002 || Palomar || NEAT || — || align=right | 2.3 km || 
|-id=414 bgcolor=#fefefe
| 215414 ||  || — || April 10, 2002 || Socorro || LINEAR || FLO || align=right | 1.0 km || 
|-id=415 bgcolor=#fefefe
| 215415 ||  || — || April 9, 2002 || Socorro || LINEAR || FLO || align=right data-sort-value="0.85" | 850 m || 
|-id=416 bgcolor=#fefefe
| 215416 ||  || — || April 10, 2002 || Socorro || LINEAR || — || align=right | 1.5 km || 
|-id=417 bgcolor=#fefefe
| 215417 ||  || — || April 10, 2002 || Socorro || LINEAR || — || align=right | 1.1 km || 
|-id=418 bgcolor=#fefefe
| 215418 ||  || — || April 11, 2002 || Socorro || LINEAR || FLO || align=right data-sort-value="0.99" | 990 m || 
|-id=419 bgcolor=#fefefe
| 215419 ||  || — || April 12, 2002 || Socorro || LINEAR || — || align=right data-sort-value="0.98" | 980 m || 
|-id=420 bgcolor=#fefefe
| 215420 ||  || — || April 14, 2002 || Socorro || LINEAR || — || align=right | 1.1 km || 
|-id=421 bgcolor=#fefefe
| 215421 ||  || — || April 13, 2002 || Palomar || NEAT || — || align=right | 1.2 km || 
|-id=422 bgcolor=#fefefe
| 215422 ||  || — || April 11, 2002 || Socorro || LINEAR || — || align=right | 1.3 km || 
|-id=423 bgcolor=#fefefe
| 215423 Winnecke ||  ||  || April 4, 2002 || Palomar || M. Meyer || — || align=right | 1.1 km || 
|-id=424 bgcolor=#fefefe
| 215424 ||  || — || May 7, 2002 || Palomar || NEAT || — || align=right | 1.1 km || 
|-id=425 bgcolor=#fefefe
| 215425 ||  || — || May 9, 2002 || Socorro || LINEAR || V || align=right data-sort-value="0.89" | 890 m || 
|-id=426 bgcolor=#fefefe
| 215426 ||  || — || May 9, 2002 || Socorro || LINEAR || V || align=right data-sort-value="0.98" | 980 m || 
|-id=427 bgcolor=#fefefe
| 215427 ||  || — || May 9, 2002 || Socorro || LINEAR || V || align=right data-sort-value="0.95" | 950 m || 
|-id=428 bgcolor=#fefefe
| 215428 ||  || — || May 10, 2002 || Reedy Creek || J. Broughton || — || align=right | 2.6 km || 
|-id=429 bgcolor=#fefefe
| 215429 ||  || — || May 9, 2002 || Socorro || LINEAR || — || align=right | 1.2 km || 
|-id=430 bgcolor=#fefefe
| 215430 ||  || — || May 11, 2002 || Socorro || LINEAR || NYS || align=right data-sort-value="0.80" | 800 m || 
|-id=431 bgcolor=#d6d6d6
| 215431 ||  || — || May 11, 2002 || Socorro || LINEAR || — || align=right | 3.8 km || 
|-id=432 bgcolor=#fefefe
| 215432 ||  || — || May 8, 2002 || Desert Eagle || W. K. Y. Yeung || FLO || align=right data-sort-value="0.89" | 890 m || 
|-id=433 bgcolor=#fefefe
| 215433 ||  || — || May 10, 2002 || Palomar || NEAT || — || align=right | 1.3 km || 
|-id=434 bgcolor=#fefefe
| 215434 ||  || — || May 16, 2002 || Socorro || LINEAR || — || align=right | 1.4 km || 
|-id=435 bgcolor=#fefefe
| 215435 ||  || — || June 5, 2002 || Socorro || LINEAR || — || align=right | 1.0 km || 
|-id=436 bgcolor=#fefefe
| 215436 ||  || — || June 5, 2002 || Socorro || LINEAR || ERI || align=right | 2.4 km || 
|-id=437 bgcolor=#fefefe
| 215437 ||  || — || June 6, 2002 || Socorro || LINEAR || — || align=right | 1.2 km || 
|-id=438 bgcolor=#fefefe
| 215438 ||  || — || June 3, 2002 || Socorro || LINEAR || CHL || align=right | 4.1 km || 
|-id=439 bgcolor=#fefefe
| 215439 ||  || — || June 9, 2002 || Socorro || LINEAR || — || align=right | 1.2 km || 
|-id=440 bgcolor=#fefefe
| 215440 ||  || — || June 15, 2002 || Kingsnake || J. V. McClusky || — || align=right | 1.3 km || 
|-id=441 bgcolor=#fefefe
| 215441 ||  || — || June 12, 2002 || Palomar || NEAT || — || align=right data-sort-value="0.98" | 980 m || 
|-id=442 bgcolor=#FFC2E0
| 215442 ||  || — || June 30, 2002 || Socorro || LINEAR || ATEslow || align=right | 1.1 km || 
|-id=443 bgcolor=#fefefe
| 215443 ||  || — || July 9, 2002 || Socorro || LINEAR || V || align=right | 1.3 km || 
|-id=444 bgcolor=#fefefe
| 215444 ||  || — || July 9, 2002 || Socorro || LINEAR || — || align=right | 1.1 km || 
|-id=445 bgcolor=#fefefe
| 215445 ||  || — || July 14, 2002 || Palomar || NEAT || NYS || align=right data-sort-value="0.74" | 740 m || 
|-id=446 bgcolor=#fefefe
| 215446 ||  || — || July 14, 2002 || Palomar || NEAT || MAS || align=right data-sort-value="0.90" | 900 m || 
|-id=447 bgcolor=#fefefe
| 215447 ||  || — || July 13, 2002 || Palomar || NEAT || — || align=right | 1.3 km || 
|-id=448 bgcolor=#fefefe
| 215448 ||  || — || July 3, 2002 || Palomar || NEAT || NYS || align=right data-sort-value="0.70" | 700 m || 
|-id=449 bgcolor=#fefefe
| 215449 ||  || — || July 21, 2002 || Palomar || NEAT || — || align=right | 1.4 km || 
|-id=450 bgcolor=#fefefe
| 215450 ||  || — || July 18, 2002 || Socorro || LINEAR || — || align=right | 1.5 km || 
|-id=451 bgcolor=#fefefe
| 215451 ||  || — || July 24, 2002 || Haleakala || NEAT || PHO || align=right | 2.4 km || 
|-id=452 bgcolor=#fefefe
| 215452 ||  || — || July 21, 2002 || Palomar || NEAT || — || align=right | 1.2 km || 
|-id=453 bgcolor=#fefefe
| 215453 ||  || — || August 5, 2002 || Campo Imperatore || CINEOS || — || align=right | 1.1 km || 
|-id=454 bgcolor=#fefefe
| 215454 ||  || — || August 6, 2002 || Palomar || NEAT || — || align=right | 1.3 km || 
|-id=455 bgcolor=#fefefe
| 215455 ||  || — || August 12, 2002 || Socorro || LINEAR || NYS || align=right data-sort-value="0.90" | 900 m || 
|-id=456 bgcolor=#fefefe
| 215456 ||  || — || August 15, 2002 || Palomar || NEAT || — || align=right | 1.2 km || 
|-id=457 bgcolor=#fefefe
| 215457 ||  || — || August 13, 2002 || Socorro || LINEAR || — || align=right | 1.5 km || 
|-id=458 bgcolor=#E9E9E9
| 215458 ||  || — || August 15, 2002 || Palomar || NEAT || — || align=right | 1.8 km || 
|-id=459 bgcolor=#fefefe
| 215459 ||  || — || August 16, 2002 || Palomar || NEAT || ERI || align=right | 2.4 km || 
|-id=460 bgcolor=#fefefe
| 215460 ||  || — || August 19, 2002 || Palomar || NEAT || — || align=right | 1.2 km || 
|-id=461 bgcolor=#fefefe
| 215461 ||  || — || August 29, 2002 || Palomar || NEAT || NYS || align=right data-sort-value="0.65" | 650 m || 
|-id=462 bgcolor=#fefefe
| 215462 ||  || — || August 17, 2002 || Palomar || NEAT || FLO || align=right data-sort-value="0.81" | 810 m || 
|-id=463 bgcolor=#fefefe
| 215463 Jobse ||  ||  || August 30, 2002 || Palomar || NEAT || MAS || align=right data-sort-value="0.97" | 970 m || 
|-id=464 bgcolor=#fefefe
| 215464 ||  || — || August 28, 2002 || Palomar || NEAT || — || align=right | 1.4 km || 
|-id=465 bgcolor=#E9E9E9
| 215465 ||  || — || August 19, 2002 || Palomar || NEAT || — || align=right | 1.3 km || 
|-id=466 bgcolor=#fefefe
| 215466 ||  || — || August 18, 2002 || Palomar || NEAT || NYS || align=right data-sort-value="0.60" | 600 m || 
|-id=467 bgcolor=#fefefe
| 215467 ||  || — || August 19, 2002 || Palomar || NEAT || ERI || align=right | 1.4 km || 
|-id=468 bgcolor=#fefefe
| 215468 ||  || — || August 30, 2002 || Palomar || NEAT || — || align=right data-sort-value="0.91" | 910 m || 
|-id=469 bgcolor=#E9E9E9
| 215469 ||  || — || September 4, 2002 || Palomar || NEAT || HNS || align=right | 1.7 km || 
|-id=470 bgcolor=#fefefe
| 215470 ||  || — || September 4, 2002 || Anderson Mesa || LONEOS || NYS || align=right data-sort-value="0.99" | 990 m || 
|-id=471 bgcolor=#d6d6d6
| 215471 ||  || — || September 4, 2002 || Anderson Mesa || LONEOS || — || align=right | 4.8 km || 
|-id=472 bgcolor=#fefefe
| 215472 ||  || — || September 5, 2002 || Socorro || LINEAR || NYS || align=right | 1.1 km || 
|-id=473 bgcolor=#fefefe
| 215473 ||  || — || September 5, 2002 || Socorro || LINEAR || FLO || align=right | 2.1 km || 
|-id=474 bgcolor=#fefefe
| 215474 ||  || — || September 4, 2002 || Anderson Mesa || LONEOS || H || align=right data-sort-value="0.96" | 960 m || 
|-id=475 bgcolor=#E9E9E9
| 215475 ||  || — || September 8, 2002 || Haleakala || NEAT || — || align=right | 1.3 km || 
|-id=476 bgcolor=#FA8072
| 215476 ||  || — || September 10, 2002 || Palomar || NEAT || — || align=right | 1.1 km || 
|-id=477 bgcolor=#fefefe
| 215477 ||  || — || September 12, 2002 || Palomar || NEAT || NYS || align=right data-sort-value="0.86" | 860 m || 
|-id=478 bgcolor=#fefefe
| 215478 ||  || — || September 12, 2002 || Palomar || NEAT || V || align=right data-sort-value="0.94" | 940 m || 
|-id=479 bgcolor=#d6d6d6
| 215479 ||  || — || September 13, 2002 || Anderson Mesa || LONEOS || LUT || align=right | 5.7 km || 
|-id=480 bgcolor=#E9E9E9
| 215480 ||  || — || September 15, 2002 || Palomar || NEAT || — || align=right | 1.1 km || 
|-id=481 bgcolor=#E9E9E9
| 215481 ||  || — || September 14, 2002 || Palomar || NEAT || — || align=right | 1.1 km || 
|-id=482 bgcolor=#E9E9E9
| 215482 ||  || — || October 2, 2002 || Socorro || LINEAR || — || align=right | 2.6 km || 
|-id=483 bgcolor=#E9E9E9
| 215483 ||  || — || October 2, 2002 || Socorro || LINEAR || — || align=right | 1.3 km || 
|-id=484 bgcolor=#fefefe
| 215484 ||  || — || October 2, 2002 || Socorro || LINEAR || NYS || align=right data-sort-value="0.80" | 800 m || 
|-id=485 bgcolor=#fefefe
| 215485 ||  || — || October 2, 2002 || Socorro || LINEAR || — || align=right | 1.2 km || 
|-id=486 bgcolor=#E9E9E9
| 215486 ||  || — || October 2, 2002 || Socorro || LINEAR || — || align=right | 1.5 km || 
|-id=487 bgcolor=#E9E9E9
| 215487 ||  || — || October 2, 2002 || Socorro || LINEAR || — || align=right | 4.1 km || 
|-id=488 bgcolor=#E9E9E9
| 215488 ||  || — || October 2, 2002 || Socorro || LINEAR || EUN || align=right | 1.8 km || 
|-id=489 bgcolor=#FA8072
| 215489 ||  || — || October 3, 2002 || Socorro || LINEAR || — || align=right | 1.1 km || 
|-id=490 bgcolor=#E9E9E9
| 215490 ||  || — || October 5, 2002 || Socorro || LINEAR || — || align=right | 2.4 km || 
|-id=491 bgcolor=#d6d6d6
| 215491 ||  || — || October 3, 2002 || Palomar || NEAT || — || align=right | 6.8 km || 
|-id=492 bgcolor=#E9E9E9
| 215492 ||  || — || October 3, 2002 || Campo Imperatore || CINEOS || — || align=right | 2.5 km || 
|-id=493 bgcolor=#E9E9E9
| 215493 ||  || — || October 4, 2002 || Socorro || LINEAR || — || align=right | 1.7 km || 
|-id=494 bgcolor=#E9E9E9
| 215494 ||  || — || October 5, 2002 || Palomar || NEAT || — || align=right | 2.9 km || 
|-id=495 bgcolor=#E9E9E9
| 215495 ||  || — || October 5, 2002 || Palomar || NEAT || MAR || align=right | 1.6 km || 
|-id=496 bgcolor=#E9E9E9
| 215496 ||  || — || October 5, 2002 || Palomar || NEAT || — || align=right | 1.6 km || 
|-id=497 bgcolor=#fefefe
| 215497 ||  || — || October 4, 2002 || Socorro || LINEAR || — || align=right | 1.6 km || 
|-id=498 bgcolor=#E9E9E9
| 215498 ||  || — || October 8, 2002 || Anderson Mesa || LONEOS || — || align=right | 5.1 km || 
|-id=499 bgcolor=#E9E9E9
| 215499 ||  || — || October 7, 2002 || Palomar || NEAT || — || align=right | 3.0 km || 
|-id=500 bgcolor=#E9E9E9
| 215500 ||  || — || October 7, 2002 || Socorro || LINEAR || EUN || align=right | 2.5 km || 
|}

215501–215600 

|-bgcolor=#E9E9E9
| 215501 ||  || — || October 9, 2002 || Socorro || LINEAR || — || align=right | 1.8 km || 
|-id=502 bgcolor=#E9E9E9
| 215502 ||  || — || October 15, 2002 || Palomar || NEAT || — || align=right | 1.1 km || 
|-id=503 bgcolor=#E9E9E9
| 215503 ||  || — || October 4, 2002 || Apache Point || SDSS || GER || align=right | 2.8 km || 
|-id=504 bgcolor=#E9E9E9
| 215504 ||  || — || October 5, 2002 || Apache Point || SDSS || — || align=right | 1.8 km || 
|-id=505 bgcolor=#E9E9E9
| 215505 ||  || — || October 10, 2002 || Apache Point || SDSS || — || align=right | 1.8 km || 
|-id=506 bgcolor=#E9E9E9
| 215506 ||  || — || October 10, 2002 || Apache Point || SDSS || ADE || align=right | 3.6 km || 
|-id=507 bgcolor=#E9E9E9
| 215507 ||  || — || October 5, 2002 || Apache Point || SDSS || RAF || align=right data-sort-value="0.98" | 980 m || 
|-id=508 bgcolor=#E9E9E9
| 215508 ||  || — || October 9, 2002 || Palomar || NEAT || — || align=right | 2.7 km || 
|-id=509 bgcolor=#E9E9E9
| 215509 ||  || — || October 15, 2002 || Palomar || NEAT || — || align=right | 2.0 km || 
|-id=510 bgcolor=#d6d6d6
| 215510 ||  || — || October 28, 2002 || Socorro || LINEAR || EUP || align=right | 6.9 km || 
|-id=511 bgcolor=#E9E9E9
| 215511 ||  || — || October 26, 2002 || Haleakala || NEAT || — || align=right | 2.3 km || 
|-id=512 bgcolor=#fefefe
| 215512 ||  || — || October 29, 2002 || Palomar || NEAT || — || align=right | 1.8 km || 
|-id=513 bgcolor=#E9E9E9
| 215513 ||  || — || October 30, 2002 || Haleakala || NEAT || — || align=right | 3.8 km || 
|-id=514 bgcolor=#E9E9E9
| 215514 ||  || — || October 31, 2002 || Socorro || LINEAR || KAZ || align=right | 1.9 km || 
|-id=515 bgcolor=#E9E9E9
| 215515 ||  || — || October 29, 2002 || Apache Point || SDSS || PAD || align=right | 2.2 km || 
|-id=516 bgcolor=#E9E9E9
| 215516 ||  || — || October 30, 2002 || Apache Point || SDSS || MIT || align=right | 1.9 km || 
|-id=517 bgcolor=#C2FFFF
| 215517 ||  || — || October 18, 2002 || Palomar || NEAT || L5 || align=right | 11 km || 
|-id=518 bgcolor=#E9E9E9
| 215518 ||  || — || October 31, 2002 || Palomar || NEAT || — || align=right | 2.7 km || 
|-id=519 bgcolor=#fefefe
| 215519 ||  || — || November 5, 2002 || Haleakala || NEAT || H || align=right data-sort-value="0.84" | 840 m || 
|-id=520 bgcolor=#E9E9E9
| 215520 ||  || — || November 5, 2002 || Socorro || LINEAR || — || align=right | 1.7 km || 
|-id=521 bgcolor=#E9E9E9
| 215521 ||  || — || November 5, 2002 || Socorro || LINEAR || — || align=right | 1.7 km || 
|-id=522 bgcolor=#fefefe
| 215522 ||  || — || November 6, 2002 || Kitt Peak || Spacewatch || — || align=right | 1.7 km || 
|-id=523 bgcolor=#E9E9E9
| 215523 ||  || — || November 6, 2002 || Needville || Needville Obs. || — || align=right | 2.6 km || 
|-id=524 bgcolor=#E9E9E9
| 215524 ||  || — || November 7, 2002 || Socorro || LINEAR || — || align=right | 1.4 km || 
|-id=525 bgcolor=#E9E9E9
| 215525 ||  || — || November 7, 2002 || Socorro || LINEAR || — || align=right | 1.7 km || 
|-id=526 bgcolor=#E9E9E9
| 215526 ||  || — || November 7, 2002 || Socorro || LINEAR || EUN || align=right | 1.9 km || 
|-id=527 bgcolor=#E9E9E9
| 215527 ||  || — || November 8, 2002 || Socorro || LINEAR || GEF || align=right | 1.9 km || 
|-id=528 bgcolor=#FA8072
| 215528 ||  || — || November 11, 2002 || Socorro || LINEAR || — || align=right | 1.3 km || 
|-id=529 bgcolor=#E9E9E9
| 215529 ||  || — || November 11, 2002 || Socorro || LINEAR || — || align=right | 4.2 km || 
|-id=530 bgcolor=#C2FFFF
| 215530 ||  || — || November 12, 2002 || Socorro || LINEAR || L5 || align=right | 19 km || 
|-id=531 bgcolor=#E9E9E9
| 215531 ||  || — || November 12, 2002 || Socorro || LINEAR || — || align=right | 1.6 km || 
|-id=532 bgcolor=#E9E9E9
| 215532 ||  || — || November 12, 2002 || Socorro || LINEAR || — || align=right | 2.6 km || 
|-id=533 bgcolor=#E9E9E9
| 215533 ||  || — || November 13, 2002 || Socorro || LINEAR || — || align=right | 2.5 km || 
|-id=534 bgcolor=#E9E9E9
| 215534 ||  || — || November 13, 2002 || Palomar || NEAT || AER || align=right | 1.8 km || 
|-id=535 bgcolor=#E9E9E9
| 215535 ||  || — || November 14, 2002 || Socorro || LINEAR || — || align=right | 1.4 km || 
|-id=536 bgcolor=#E9E9E9
| 215536 ||  || — || November 24, 2002 || Palomar || NEAT || — || align=right | 1.7 km || 
|-id=537 bgcolor=#E9E9E9
| 215537 ||  || — || November 24, 2002 || Palomar || NEAT || — || align=right | 5.2 km || 
|-id=538 bgcolor=#E9E9E9
| 215538 ||  || — || November 25, 2002 || Palomar || NEAT || — || align=right | 2.8 km || 
|-id=539 bgcolor=#E9E9E9
| 215539 ||  || — || November 27, 2002 || Anderson Mesa || LONEOS || GER || align=right | 2.9 km || 
|-id=540 bgcolor=#E9E9E9
| 215540 ||  || — || November 30, 2002 || Socorro || LINEAR || — || align=right | 4.6 km || 
|-id=541 bgcolor=#E9E9E9
| 215541 ||  || — || November 28, 2002 || Haleakala || NEAT || MAR || align=right | 1.8 km || 
|-id=542 bgcolor=#C2FFFF
| 215542 ||  || — || November 16, 2002 || Palomar || NEAT || L5 || align=right | 16 km || 
|-id=543 bgcolor=#fefefe
| 215543 ||  || — || December 1, 2002 || Socorro || LINEAR || H || align=right | 1.4 km || 
|-id=544 bgcolor=#E9E9E9
| 215544 ||  || — || December 5, 2002 || Socorro || LINEAR || — || align=right | 1.8 km || 
|-id=545 bgcolor=#E9E9E9
| 215545 ||  || — || December 5, 2002 || Socorro || LINEAR || — || align=right | 2.8 km || 
|-id=546 bgcolor=#E9E9E9
| 215546 ||  || — || December 10, 2002 || Socorro || LINEAR || — || align=right | 1.8 km || 
|-id=547 bgcolor=#E9E9E9
| 215547 ||  || — || December 8, 2002 || Haleakala || NEAT || — || align=right | 1.7 km || 
|-id=548 bgcolor=#E9E9E9
| 215548 ||  || — || December 11, 2002 || Socorro || LINEAR || — || align=right | 1.1 km || 
|-id=549 bgcolor=#E9E9E9
| 215549 ||  || — || December 11, 2002 || Socorro || LINEAR || — || align=right | 2.0 km || 
|-id=550 bgcolor=#E9E9E9
| 215550 ||  || — || December 5, 2002 || Socorro || LINEAR || — || align=right | 2.1 km || 
|-id=551 bgcolor=#C2FFFF
| 215551 ||  || — || December 27, 2002 || Palomar || NEAT || L5 || align=right | 12 km || 
|-id=552 bgcolor=#E9E9E9
| 215552 ||  || — || January 5, 2003 || Anderson Mesa || LONEOS || — || align=right | 3.5 km || 
|-id=553 bgcolor=#E9E9E9
| 215553 ||  || — || January 7, 2003 || Socorro || LINEAR || — || align=right | 3.3 km || 
|-id=554 bgcolor=#E9E9E9
| 215554 ||  || — || January 5, 2003 || Socorro || LINEAR || — || align=right | 3.1 km || 
|-id=555 bgcolor=#d6d6d6
| 215555 ||  || — || January 8, 2003 || Socorro || LINEAR || THM || align=right | 3.4 km || 
|-id=556 bgcolor=#d6d6d6
| 215556 ||  || — || January 7, 2003 || Socorro || LINEAR || — || align=right | 4.6 km || 
|-id=557 bgcolor=#d6d6d6
| 215557 ||  || — || January 26, 2003 || Anderson Mesa || LONEOS || — || align=right | 4.1 km || 
|-id=558 bgcolor=#d6d6d6
| 215558 ||  || — || January 27, 2003 || Socorro || LINEAR || — || align=right | 3.5 km || 
|-id=559 bgcolor=#d6d6d6
| 215559 ||  || — || January 29, 2003 || Palomar || NEAT || EOS || align=right | 2.7 km || 
|-id=560 bgcolor=#d6d6d6
| 215560 ||  || — || January 27, 2003 || Socorro || LINEAR || EOS || align=right | 2.7 km || 
|-id=561 bgcolor=#d6d6d6
| 215561 ||  || — || February 8, 2003 || Socorro || LINEAR || — || align=right | 3.2 km || 
|-id=562 bgcolor=#d6d6d6
| 215562 ||  || — || February 9, 2003 || Palomar || NEAT || — || align=right | 3.5 km || 
|-id=563 bgcolor=#d6d6d6
| 215563 ||  || — || February 19, 2003 || Palomar || NEAT || — || align=right | 3.8 km || 
|-id=564 bgcolor=#d6d6d6
| 215564 ||  || — || February 28, 2003 || Socorro || LINEAR || — || align=right | 5.5 km || 
|-id=565 bgcolor=#d6d6d6
| 215565 ||  || — || March 6, 2003 || Anderson Mesa || LONEOS || — || align=right | 4.0 km || 
|-id=566 bgcolor=#d6d6d6
| 215566 ||  || — || March 8, 2003 || Socorro || LINEAR || — || align=right | 5.2 km || 
|-id=567 bgcolor=#d6d6d6
| 215567 ||  || — || March 10, 2003 || Kitt Peak || Spacewatch || EOS || align=right | 2.8 km || 
|-id=568 bgcolor=#E9E9E9
| 215568 ||  || — || March 24, 2003 || Kitt Peak || Spacewatch || — || align=right | 2.5 km || 
|-id=569 bgcolor=#d6d6d6
| 215569 ||  || — || March 24, 2003 || Kitt Peak || Spacewatch || — || align=right | 3.7 km || 
|-id=570 bgcolor=#d6d6d6
| 215570 ||  || — || March 24, 2003 || Kitt Peak || Spacewatch || — || align=right | 5.1 km || 
|-id=571 bgcolor=#d6d6d6
| 215571 ||  || — || March 24, 2003 || Haleakala || NEAT || — || align=right | 5.5 km || 
|-id=572 bgcolor=#d6d6d6
| 215572 ||  || — || March 25, 2003 || Palomar || NEAT || LIX || align=right | 4.8 km || 
|-id=573 bgcolor=#d6d6d6
| 215573 ||  || — || March 26, 2003 || Palomar || NEAT || HYG || align=right | 3.9 km || 
|-id=574 bgcolor=#d6d6d6
| 215574 ||  || — || March 26, 2003 || Palomar || NEAT || THB || align=right | 4.2 km || 
|-id=575 bgcolor=#d6d6d6
| 215575 ||  || — || March 26, 2003 || Palomar || NEAT || — || align=right | 4.6 km || 
|-id=576 bgcolor=#d6d6d6
| 215576 ||  || — || March 27, 2003 || Palomar || NEAT || — || align=right | 5.3 km || 
|-id=577 bgcolor=#d6d6d6
| 215577 ||  || — || March 27, 2003 || Socorro || LINEAR || — || align=right | 5.3 km || 
|-id=578 bgcolor=#d6d6d6
| 215578 ||  || — || March 27, 2003 || Palomar || NEAT || — || align=right | 5.3 km || 
|-id=579 bgcolor=#d6d6d6
| 215579 ||  || — || March 29, 2003 || Kitt Peak || Spacewatch || EOS || align=right | 3.0 km || 
|-id=580 bgcolor=#d6d6d6
| 215580 ||  || — || March 30, 2003 || Kitt Peak || Spacewatch || — || align=right | 4.7 km || 
|-id=581 bgcolor=#d6d6d6
| 215581 ||  || — || March 29, 2003 || Kitt Peak || Spacewatch || — || align=right | 4.8 km || 
|-id=582 bgcolor=#d6d6d6
| 215582 ||  || — || April 3, 2003 || Haleakala || NEAT || — || align=right | 5.1 km || 
|-id=583 bgcolor=#d6d6d6
| 215583 ||  || — || April 7, 2003 || Socorro || LINEAR || THB || align=right | 4.2 km || 
|-id=584 bgcolor=#d6d6d6
| 215584 ||  || — || April 5, 2003 || Anderson Mesa || LONEOS || — || align=right | 4.4 km || 
|-id=585 bgcolor=#d6d6d6
| 215585 ||  || — || April 7, 2003 || Kitt Peak || Spacewatch || — || align=right | 5.0 km || 
|-id=586 bgcolor=#d6d6d6
| 215586 ||  || — || April 9, 2003 || Palomar || NEAT || — || align=right | 5.3 km || 
|-id=587 bgcolor=#d6d6d6
| 215587 ||  || — || April 9, 2003 || Haleakala || NEAT || — || align=right | 7.0 km || 
|-id=588 bgcolor=#FFC2E0
| 215588 ||  || — || April 24, 2003 || Anderson Mesa || LONEOS || APOPHA || align=right data-sort-value="0.49" | 490 m || 
|-id=589 bgcolor=#d6d6d6
| 215589 ||  || — || May 2, 2003 || Socorro || LINEAR || — || align=right | 5.3 km || 
|-id=590 bgcolor=#E9E9E9
| 215590 ||  || — || May 23, 2003 || Kitt Peak || Spacewatch || — || align=right | 4.8 km || 
|-id=591 bgcolor=#fefefe
| 215591 ||  || — || July 18, 2003 || Siding Spring || R. H. McNaught || — || align=right | 1.1 km || 
|-id=592 bgcolor=#E9E9E9
| 215592 Normarose ||  ||  || August 3, 2003 || Norma Rose || J. Riffle, W. K. Y. Yeung || — || align=right | 3.0 km || 
|-id=593 bgcolor=#d6d6d6
| 215593 ||  || — || August 20, 2003 || Campo Imperatore || CINEOS || — || align=right | 4.0 km || 
|-id=594 bgcolor=#fefefe
| 215594 ||  || — || August 23, 2003 || Socorro || LINEAR || FLO || align=right data-sort-value="0.85" | 850 m || 
|-id=595 bgcolor=#fefefe
| 215595 ||  || — || August 22, 2003 || Socorro || LINEAR || — || align=right | 1.3 km || 
|-id=596 bgcolor=#fefefe
| 215596 ||  || — || August 22, 2003 || Socorro || LINEAR || FLO || align=right | 1.3 km || 
|-id=597 bgcolor=#fefefe
| 215597 ||  || — || August 24, 2003 || Socorro || LINEAR || — || align=right | 1.3 km || 
|-id=598 bgcolor=#fefefe
| 215598 ||  || — || August 31, 2003 || Socorro || LINEAR || FLO || align=right | 1.4 km || 
|-id=599 bgcolor=#fefefe
| 215599 ||  || — || September 2, 2003 || Reedy Creek || J. Broughton || — || align=right | 1.5 km || 
|-id=600 bgcolor=#fefefe
| 215600 ||  || — || September 15, 2003 || Palomar || NEAT || — || align=right | 1.8 km || 
|}

215601–215700 

|-bgcolor=#fefefe
| 215601 ||  || — || September 15, 2003 || Haleakala || NEAT || — || align=right | 1.2 km || 
|-id=602 bgcolor=#fefefe
| 215602 ||  || — || September 15, 2003 || Anderson Mesa || LONEOS || FLO || align=right data-sort-value="0.73" | 730 m || 
|-id=603 bgcolor=#fefefe
| 215603 ||  || — || September 16, 2003 || Kitt Peak || Spacewatch || — || align=right | 1.3 km || 
|-id=604 bgcolor=#fefefe
| 215604 ||  || — || September 17, 2003 || Kitt Peak || Spacewatch || — || align=right | 1.0 km || 
|-id=605 bgcolor=#fefefe
| 215605 ||  || — || September 18, 2003 || Palomar || NEAT || — || align=right | 1.1 km || 
|-id=606 bgcolor=#fefefe
| 215606 ||  || — || September 17, 2003 || Klet || J. Tichá, M. Tichý || — || align=right | 1.3 km || 
|-id=607 bgcolor=#d6d6d6
| 215607 ||  || — || September 16, 2003 || Palomar || NEAT || — || align=right | 4.0 km || 
|-id=608 bgcolor=#fefefe
| 215608 ||  || — || September 17, 2003 || Kitt Peak || Spacewatch || — || align=right | 1.3 km || 
|-id=609 bgcolor=#fefefe
| 215609 ||  || — || September 19, 2003 || Socorro || LINEAR || — || align=right data-sort-value="0.89" | 890 m || 
|-id=610 bgcolor=#fefefe
| 215610 ||  || — || September 18, 2003 || Kitt Peak || Spacewatch || — || align=right | 1.1 km || 
|-id=611 bgcolor=#fefefe
| 215611 ||  || — || September 18, 2003 || Socorro || LINEAR || — || align=right | 1.2 km || 
|-id=612 bgcolor=#fefefe
| 215612 ||  || — || September 19, 2003 || Socorro || LINEAR || — || align=right data-sort-value="0.97" | 970 m || 
|-id=613 bgcolor=#fefefe
| 215613 ||  || — || September 20, 2003 || Palomar || NEAT || V || align=right | 1.0 km || 
|-id=614 bgcolor=#fefefe
| 215614 ||  || — || September 17, 2003 || Haleakala || NEAT || — || align=right | 1.00 km || 
|-id=615 bgcolor=#fefefe
| 215615 ||  || — || September 19, 2003 || Palomar || NEAT || FLO || align=right data-sort-value="0.99" | 990 m || 
|-id=616 bgcolor=#fefefe
| 215616 ||  || — || September 19, 2003 || Socorro || LINEAR || — || align=right | 1.1 km || 
|-id=617 bgcolor=#fefefe
| 215617 ||  || — || September 20, 2003 || Palomar || NEAT || — || align=right data-sort-value="0.98" | 980 m || 
|-id=618 bgcolor=#fefefe
| 215618 ||  || — || September 20, 2003 || Anderson Mesa || LONEOS || FLO || align=right | 1.1 km || 
|-id=619 bgcolor=#fefefe
| 215619 ||  || — || September 23, 2003 || Haleakala || NEAT || DAT || align=right | 1.1 km || 
|-id=620 bgcolor=#fefefe
| 215620 ||  || — || September 26, 2003 || Socorro || LINEAR || — || align=right | 1.1 km || 
|-id=621 bgcolor=#fefefe
| 215621 ||  || — || September 26, 2003 || Desert Eagle || W. K. Y. Yeung || — || align=right | 1.4 km || 
|-id=622 bgcolor=#fefefe
| 215622 ||  || — || September 29, 2003 || Desert Eagle || W. K. Y. Yeung || — || align=right | 1.2 km || 
|-id=623 bgcolor=#E9E9E9
| 215623 ||  || — || September 27, 2003 || Kitt Peak || Spacewatch || WIT || align=right | 1.5 km || 
|-id=624 bgcolor=#d6d6d6
| 215624 ||  || — || September 26, 2003 || Klet || Kleť Obs. || EOS || align=right | 3.6 km || 
|-id=625 bgcolor=#fefefe
| 215625 ||  || — || September 26, 2003 || Socorro || LINEAR || — || align=right | 1.1 km || 
|-id=626 bgcolor=#fefefe
| 215626 ||  || — || September 28, 2003 || Kitt Peak || Spacewatch || — || align=right | 1.1 km || 
|-id=627 bgcolor=#fefefe
| 215627 ||  || — || September 28, 2003 || Socorro || LINEAR || NYS || align=right data-sort-value="0.84" | 840 m || 
|-id=628 bgcolor=#fefefe
| 215628 ||  || — || September 25, 2003 || Haleakala || NEAT || — || align=right | 1.4 km || 
|-id=629 bgcolor=#fefefe
| 215629 ||  || — || September 28, 2003 || Socorro || LINEAR || FLO || align=right | 1.1 km || 
|-id=630 bgcolor=#d6d6d6
| 215630 ||  || — || September 28, 2003 || Anderson Mesa || LONEOS || — || align=right | 5.4 km || 
|-id=631 bgcolor=#fefefe
| 215631 ||  || — || September 30, 2003 || Anderson Mesa || LONEOS || — || align=right | 1.3 km || 
|-id=632 bgcolor=#E9E9E9
| 215632 ||  || — || September 18, 2003 || Palomar || NEAT || — || align=right | 3.6 km || 
|-id=633 bgcolor=#fefefe
| 215633 ||  || — || September 22, 2003 || Palomar || NEAT || V || align=right data-sort-value="0.96" | 960 m || 
|-id=634 bgcolor=#fefefe
| 215634 ||  || — || September 26, 2003 || Apache Point || SDSS || V || align=right data-sort-value="0.89" | 890 m || 
|-id=635 bgcolor=#fefefe
| 215635 ||  || — || October 1, 2003 || Kitt Peak || Spacewatch || FLO || align=right data-sort-value="0.87" | 870 m || 
|-id=636 bgcolor=#fefefe
| 215636 ||  || — || October 15, 2003 || Anderson Mesa || LONEOS || — || align=right | 1.5 km || 
|-id=637 bgcolor=#fefefe
| 215637 ||  || — || October 2, 2003 || Kitt Peak || Spacewatch || — || align=right | 1.1 km || 
|-id=638 bgcolor=#d6d6d6
| 215638 ||  || — || October 3, 2003 || Haleakala || NEAT || — || align=right | 5.7 km || 
|-id=639 bgcolor=#fefefe
| 215639 ||  || — || October 15, 2003 || Anderson Mesa || LONEOS || V || align=right | 1.1 km || 
|-id=640 bgcolor=#fefefe
| 215640 ||  || — || October 16, 2003 || Kitt Peak || Spacewatch || V || align=right data-sort-value="0.89" | 890 m || 
|-id=641 bgcolor=#fefefe
| 215641 ||  || — || October 21, 2003 || Kitt Peak || Spacewatch || — || align=right | 1.1 km || 
|-id=642 bgcolor=#fefefe
| 215642 ||  || — || October 23, 2003 || Anderson Mesa || LONEOS || — || align=right | 1.5 km || 
|-id=643 bgcolor=#fefefe
| 215643 ||  || — || October 23, 2003 || Goodricke-Pigott || R. A. Tucker || — || align=right | 1.2 km || 
|-id=644 bgcolor=#fefefe
| 215644 ||  || — || October 22, 2003 || Goodricke-Pigott || R. A. Tucker || NYS || align=right | 1.8 km || 
|-id=645 bgcolor=#fefefe
| 215645 ||  || — || October 17, 2003 || Kitt Peak || Spacewatch || — || align=right data-sort-value="0.82" | 820 m || 
|-id=646 bgcolor=#fefefe
| 215646 ||  || — || October 16, 2003 || Palomar || NEAT || FLO || align=right data-sort-value="0.78" | 780 m || 
|-id=647 bgcolor=#fefefe
| 215647 ||  || — || October 19, 2003 || Kitt Peak || Spacewatch || V || align=right data-sort-value="0.78" | 780 m || 
|-id=648 bgcolor=#fefefe
| 215648 ||  || — || October 17, 2003 || Anderson Mesa || LONEOS || FLO || align=right | 1.1 km || 
|-id=649 bgcolor=#fefefe
| 215649 ||  || — || October 20, 2003 || Palomar || NEAT || NYS || align=right | 1.2 km || 
|-id=650 bgcolor=#d6d6d6
| 215650 ||  || — || October 19, 2003 || Palomar || NEAT || — || align=right | 5.9 km || 
|-id=651 bgcolor=#fefefe
| 215651 ||  || — || October 22, 2003 || Kitt Peak || Spacewatch || — || align=right | 1.2 km || 
|-id=652 bgcolor=#fefefe
| 215652 ||  || — || October 21, 2003 || Socorro || LINEAR || NYS || align=right data-sort-value="0.70" | 700 m || 
|-id=653 bgcolor=#fefefe
| 215653 ||  || — || October 19, 2003 || Kitt Peak || Spacewatch || FLO || align=right | 1.6 km || 
|-id=654 bgcolor=#fefefe
| 215654 ||  || — || October 18, 2003 || Anderson Mesa || LONEOS || — || align=right | 1.7 km || 
|-id=655 bgcolor=#E9E9E9
| 215655 ||  || — || October 20, 2003 || Socorro || LINEAR || HOF || align=right | 3.5 km || 
|-id=656 bgcolor=#fefefe
| 215656 ||  || — || October 20, 2003 || Kitt Peak || Spacewatch || MAS || align=right | 1.1 km || 
|-id=657 bgcolor=#fefefe
| 215657 ||  || — || October 21, 2003 || Socorro || LINEAR || V || align=right data-sort-value="0.94" | 940 m || 
|-id=658 bgcolor=#fefefe
| 215658 ||  || — || October 21, 2003 || Socorro || LINEAR || NYS || align=right | 2.5 km || 
|-id=659 bgcolor=#d6d6d6
| 215659 ||  || — || October 21, 2003 || Palomar || NEAT || — || align=right | 3.7 km || 
|-id=660 bgcolor=#d6d6d6
| 215660 ||  || — || October 21, 2003 || Palomar || NEAT || EOS || align=right | 3.1 km || 
|-id=661 bgcolor=#fefefe
| 215661 ||  || — || October 21, 2003 || Socorro || LINEAR || — || align=right | 1.1 km || 
|-id=662 bgcolor=#E9E9E9
| 215662 ||  || — || October 22, 2003 || Socorro || LINEAR || — || align=right | 2.0 km || 
|-id=663 bgcolor=#fefefe
| 215663 ||  || — || October 23, 2003 || Kitt Peak || Spacewatch || — || align=right | 1.4 km || 
|-id=664 bgcolor=#FA8072
| 215664 ||  || — || October 24, 2003 || Haleakala || NEAT || — || align=right | 1.3 km || 
|-id=665 bgcolor=#fefefe
| 215665 ||  || — || October 23, 2003 || Anderson Mesa || LONEOS || V || align=right data-sort-value="0.95" | 950 m || 
|-id=666 bgcolor=#fefefe
| 215666 ||  || — || October 24, 2003 || Socorro || LINEAR || — || align=right data-sort-value="0.84" | 840 m || 
|-id=667 bgcolor=#fefefe
| 215667 ||  || — || October 26, 2003 || Anderson Mesa || LONEOS || — || align=right | 2.1 km || 
|-id=668 bgcolor=#fefefe
| 215668 ||  || — || October 28, 2003 || Socorro || LINEAR || FLO || align=right data-sort-value="0.88" | 880 m || 
|-id=669 bgcolor=#fefefe
| 215669 ||  || — || October 30, 2003 || Haleakala || NEAT || — || align=right | 1.4 km || 
|-id=670 bgcolor=#fefefe
| 215670 ||  || — || October 25, 2003 || Socorro || LINEAR || NYS || align=right | 2.3 km || 
|-id=671 bgcolor=#E9E9E9
| 215671 ||  || — || October 26, 2003 || Kitt Peak || Spacewatch || — || align=right | 1.6 km || 
|-id=672 bgcolor=#d6d6d6
| 215672 ||  || — || October 21, 2003 || Palomar || NEAT || — || align=right | 3.3 km || 
|-id=673 bgcolor=#fefefe
| 215673 ||  || — || October 22, 2003 || Apache Point || SDSS || — || align=right data-sort-value="0.84" | 840 m || 
|-id=674 bgcolor=#fefefe
| 215674 ||  || — || October 22, 2003 || Apache Point || SDSS || V || align=right data-sort-value="0.99" | 990 m || 
|-id=675 bgcolor=#fefefe
| 215675 ||  || — || October 23, 2003 || Apache Point || SDSS || — || align=right data-sort-value="0.95" | 950 m || 
|-id=676 bgcolor=#fefefe
| 215676 ||  || — || November 15, 2003 || Palomar || NEAT || FLO || align=right | 1.0 km || 
|-id=677 bgcolor=#d6d6d6
| 215677 ||  || — || November 16, 2003 || Catalina || CSS || — || align=right | 5.4 km || 
|-id=678 bgcolor=#fefefe
| 215678 ||  || — || November 16, 2003 || Catalina || CSS || FLO || align=right data-sort-value="0.92" | 920 m || 
|-id=679 bgcolor=#fefefe
| 215679 ||  || — || November 18, 2003 || Kitt Peak || Spacewatch || — || align=right | 1.0 km || 
|-id=680 bgcolor=#fefefe
| 215680 ||  || — || November 20, 2003 || Palomar || NEAT || V || align=right data-sort-value="0.69" | 690 m || 
|-id=681 bgcolor=#fefefe
| 215681 ||  || — || November 23, 2003 || Kitt Peak || Spacewatch || PHO || align=right | 1.9 km || 
|-id=682 bgcolor=#fefefe
| 215682 ||  || — || November 26, 2003 || Kitt Peak || Spacewatch || V || align=right | 1.2 km || 
|-id=683 bgcolor=#fefefe
| 215683 ||  || — || November 29, 2003 || Socorro || LINEAR || V || align=right data-sort-value="0.91" | 910 m || 
|-id=684 bgcolor=#fefefe
| 215684 ||  || — || November 28, 2003 || Kitt Peak || Spacewatch || MAS || align=right data-sort-value="0.97" | 970 m || 
|-id=685 bgcolor=#E9E9E9
| 215685 ||  || — || November 21, 2003 || Kitt Peak || M. W. Buie || — || align=right | 3.3 km || 
|-id=686 bgcolor=#E9E9E9
| 215686 ||  || — || December 15, 2003 || Kitt Peak || Spacewatch || JUN || align=right | 1.3 km || 
|-id=687 bgcolor=#E9E9E9
| 215687 ||  || — || December 17, 2003 || Anderson Mesa || LONEOS || — || align=right | 3.2 km || 
|-id=688 bgcolor=#d6d6d6
| 215688 ||  || — || December 20, 2003 || Socorro || LINEAR || — || align=right | 5.7 km || 
|-id=689 bgcolor=#fefefe
| 215689 ||  || — || December 18, 2003 || Socorro || LINEAR || V || align=right | 1.0 km || 
|-id=690 bgcolor=#fefefe
| 215690 ||  || — || December 19, 2003 || Kitt Peak || Spacewatch || V || align=right | 1.1 km || 
|-id=691 bgcolor=#fefefe
| 215691 ||  || — || December 19, 2003 || Socorro || LINEAR || — || align=right data-sort-value="0.90" | 900 m || 
|-id=692 bgcolor=#E9E9E9
| 215692 ||  || — || December 19, 2003 || Socorro || LINEAR || — || align=right | 1.5 km || 
|-id=693 bgcolor=#fefefe
| 215693 ||  || — || December 20, 2003 || Socorro || LINEAR || V || align=right data-sort-value="0.95" | 950 m || 
|-id=694 bgcolor=#fefefe
| 215694 ||  || — || December 18, 2003 || Socorro || LINEAR || V || align=right data-sort-value="0.80" | 800 m || 
|-id=695 bgcolor=#E9E9E9
| 215695 ||  || — || December 19, 2003 || Kitt Peak || Spacewatch || — || align=right | 1.3 km || 
|-id=696 bgcolor=#E9E9E9
| 215696 ||  || — || December 19, 2003 || Socorro || LINEAR || — || align=right | 1.4 km || 
|-id=697 bgcolor=#fefefe
| 215697 ||  || — || December 19, 2003 || Socorro || LINEAR || NYS || align=right data-sort-value="0.96" | 960 m || 
|-id=698 bgcolor=#fefefe
| 215698 ||  || — || December 27, 2003 || Socorro || LINEAR || — || align=right | 1.2 km || 
|-id=699 bgcolor=#E9E9E9
| 215699 ||  || — || December 27, 2003 || Kitt Peak || Spacewatch || RAF || align=right data-sort-value="0.95" | 950 m || 
|-id=700 bgcolor=#E9E9E9
| 215700 ||  || — || December 27, 2003 || Socorro || LINEAR || — || align=right | 2.3 km || 
|}

215701–215800 

|-bgcolor=#d6d6d6
| 215701 ||  || — || December 27, 2003 || Socorro || LINEAR || URS || align=right | 6.7 km || 
|-id=702 bgcolor=#fefefe
| 215702 ||  || — || December 26, 2003 || Pla D'Arguines || Pla D'Arguines Obs. || — || align=right data-sort-value="0.80" | 800 m || 
|-id=703 bgcolor=#E9E9E9
| 215703 ||  || — || December 27, 2003 || Socorro || LINEAR || — || align=right | 3.1 km || 
|-id=704 bgcolor=#d6d6d6
| 215704 ||  || — || January 12, 2004 || Palomar || NEAT || HYG || align=right | 3.3 km || 
|-id=705 bgcolor=#fefefe
| 215705 ||  || — || January 13, 2004 || Anderson Mesa || LONEOS || ERI || align=right | 2.2 km || 
|-id=706 bgcolor=#fefefe
| 215706 ||  || — || January 13, 2004 || Anderson Mesa || LONEOS || — || align=right | 2.2 km || 
|-id=707 bgcolor=#E9E9E9
| 215707 ||  || — || January 15, 2004 || Kitt Peak || Spacewatch || — || align=right | 4.1 km || 
|-id=708 bgcolor=#E9E9E9
| 215708 ||  || — || January 13, 2004 || Palomar || NEAT || JUN || align=right | 2.0 km || 
|-id=709 bgcolor=#E9E9E9
| 215709 ||  || — || January 19, 2004 || Anderson Mesa || LONEOS || — || align=right | 1.6 km || 
|-id=710 bgcolor=#E9E9E9
| 215710 ||  || — || January 17, 2004 || Palomar || NEAT || MIS || align=right | 3.0 km || 
|-id=711 bgcolor=#d6d6d6
| 215711 ||  || — || January 21, 2004 || Socorro || LINEAR || — || align=right | 4.0 km || 
|-id=712 bgcolor=#E9E9E9
| 215712 ||  || — || January 21, 2004 || Socorro || LINEAR || — || align=right | 2.9 km || 
|-id=713 bgcolor=#E9E9E9
| 215713 ||  || — || January 23, 2004 || Socorro || LINEAR || ADE || align=right | 3.2 km || 
|-id=714 bgcolor=#d6d6d6
| 215714 ||  || — || January 25, 2004 || Haleakala || NEAT || HYG || align=right | 3.7 km || 
|-id=715 bgcolor=#E9E9E9
| 215715 ||  || — || January 22, 2004 || Socorro || LINEAR || — || align=right | 2.0 km || 
|-id=716 bgcolor=#fefefe
| 215716 ||  || — || January 24, 2004 || Socorro || LINEAR || NYS || align=right data-sort-value="0.96" | 960 m || 
|-id=717 bgcolor=#E9E9E9
| 215717 ||  || — || January 22, 2004 || Palomar || NEAT || — || align=right | 2.7 km || 
|-id=718 bgcolor=#E9E9E9
| 215718 ||  || — || January 26, 2004 || Anderson Mesa || LONEOS || — || align=right | 3.5 km || 
|-id=719 bgcolor=#E9E9E9
| 215719 ||  || — || January 28, 2004 || Socorro || LINEAR || ADE || align=right | 3.6 km || 
|-id=720 bgcolor=#E9E9E9
| 215720 ||  || — || January 28, 2004 || Socorro || LINEAR || — || align=right | 4.4 km || 
|-id=721 bgcolor=#E9E9E9
| 215721 ||  || — || January 24, 2004 || Socorro || LINEAR || — || align=right | 3.3 km || 
|-id=722 bgcolor=#d6d6d6
| 215722 ||  || — || January 24, 2004 || Socorro || LINEAR || — || align=right | 4.8 km || 
|-id=723 bgcolor=#E9E9E9
| 215723 ||  || — || January 29, 2004 || Socorro || LINEAR || — || align=right | 2.5 km || 
|-id=724 bgcolor=#E9E9E9
| 215724 ||  || — || January 30, 2004 || Socorro || LINEAR || — || align=right | 2.0 km || 
|-id=725 bgcolor=#E9E9E9
| 215725 ||  || — || January 27, 2004 || Catalina || CSS || — || align=right | 2.8 km || 
|-id=726 bgcolor=#d6d6d6
| 215726 ||  || — || January 28, 2004 || Catalina || CSS || — || align=right | 4.1 km || 
|-id=727 bgcolor=#E9E9E9
| 215727 ||  || — || January 17, 2004 || Palomar || NEAT || MIS || align=right | 2.8 km || 
|-id=728 bgcolor=#E9E9E9
| 215728 ||  || — || February 9, 2004 || Palomar || NEAT || — || align=right | 5.1 km || 
|-id=729 bgcolor=#fefefe
| 215729 ||  || — || February 11, 2004 || Kitt Peak || Spacewatch || V || align=right data-sort-value="0.97" | 970 m || 
|-id=730 bgcolor=#E9E9E9
| 215730 ||  || — || February 12, 2004 || Kitt Peak || Spacewatch || — || align=right | 1.1 km || 
|-id=731 bgcolor=#E9E9E9
| 215731 ||  || — || February 10, 2004 || Palomar || NEAT || MAR || align=right | 1.6 km || 
|-id=732 bgcolor=#E9E9E9
| 215732 ||  || — || February 14, 2004 || Palomar || NEAT || — || align=right | 2.8 km || 
|-id=733 bgcolor=#fefefe
| 215733 ||  || — || February 12, 2004 || Palomar || NEAT || V || align=right data-sort-value="0.97" | 970 m || 
|-id=734 bgcolor=#d6d6d6
| 215734 ||  || — || February 17, 2004 || Socorro || LINEAR || EOS || align=right | 2.4 km || 
|-id=735 bgcolor=#E9E9E9
| 215735 ||  || — || February 19, 2004 || Socorro || LINEAR || — || align=right | 2.2 km || 
|-id=736 bgcolor=#E9E9E9
| 215736 ||  || — || February 16, 2004 || Kitt Peak || Spacewatch || — || align=right | 2.0 km || 
|-id=737 bgcolor=#E9E9E9
| 215737 ||  || — || February 18, 2004 || Haleakala || NEAT || — || align=right | 2.6 km || 
|-id=738 bgcolor=#E9E9E9
| 215738 ||  || — || February 19, 2004 || Haleakala || NEAT || — || align=right | 3.5 km || 
|-id=739 bgcolor=#E9E9E9
| 215739 ||  || — || February 23, 2004 || Bergisch Gladbach || W. Bickel || — || align=right | 1.8 km || 
|-id=740 bgcolor=#E9E9E9
| 215740 ||  || — || March 9, 2004 || Palomar || NEAT || — || align=right | 3.6 km || 
|-id=741 bgcolor=#E9E9E9
| 215741 ||  || — || March 10, 2004 || Palomar || NEAT || — || align=right | 3.9 km || 
|-id=742 bgcolor=#E9E9E9
| 215742 ||  || — || March 12, 2004 || Palomar || NEAT || — || align=right | 4.0 km || 
|-id=743 bgcolor=#E9E9E9
| 215743 ||  || — || March 15, 2004 || Kitt Peak || Spacewatch || — || align=right | 2.2 km || 
|-id=744 bgcolor=#E9E9E9
| 215744 ||  || — || March 15, 2004 || Socorro || LINEAR || — || align=right | 2.3 km || 
|-id=745 bgcolor=#d6d6d6
| 215745 ||  || — || March 12, 2004 || Palomar || NEAT || EOS || align=right | 2.9 km || 
|-id=746 bgcolor=#fefefe
| 215746 ||  || — || March 13, 2004 || Palomar || NEAT || — || align=right | 1.4 km || 
|-id=747 bgcolor=#d6d6d6
| 215747 ||  || — || March 13, 2004 || Palomar || NEAT || — || align=right | 3.6 km || 
|-id=748 bgcolor=#E9E9E9
| 215748 ||  || — || March 14, 2004 || Socorro || LINEAR || — || align=right | 2.1 km || 
|-id=749 bgcolor=#d6d6d6
| 215749 ||  || — || March 14, 2004 || Kitt Peak || Spacewatch || — || align=right | 4.9 km || 
|-id=750 bgcolor=#fefefe
| 215750 ||  || — || March 15, 2004 || Socorro || LINEAR || — || align=right | 1.2 km || 
|-id=751 bgcolor=#E9E9E9
| 215751 ||  || — || March 15, 2004 || Kitt Peak || Spacewatch || — || align=right | 2.2 km || 
|-id=752 bgcolor=#fefefe
| 215752 ||  || — || March 16, 2004 || Campo Imperatore || CINEOS || V || align=right data-sort-value="0.99" | 990 m || 
|-id=753 bgcolor=#E9E9E9
| 215753 ||  || — || March 16, 2004 || Socorro || LINEAR || HNA || align=right | 3.1 km || 
|-id=754 bgcolor=#E9E9E9
| 215754 ||  || — || March 16, 2004 || Kitt Peak || Spacewatch || — || align=right | 2.6 km || 
|-id=755 bgcolor=#E9E9E9
| 215755 ||  || — || March 19, 2004 || Palomar || NEAT || — || align=right | 2.3 km || 
|-id=756 bgcolor=#E9E9E9
| 215756 ||  || — || March 19, 2004 || Socorro || LINEAR || — || align=right | 2.5 km || 
|-id=757 bgcolor=#FFC2E0
| 215757 ||  || — || March 19, 2004 || Socorro || LINEAR || AMO +1km || align=right data-sort-value="0.78" | 780 m || 
|-id=758 bgcolor=#E9E9E9
| 215758 ||  || — || March 21, 2004 || Kitt Peak || Spacewatch || — || align=right | 3.0 km || 
|-id=759 bgcolor=#E9E9E9
| 215759 ||  || — || March 19, 2004 || Palomar || NEAT || — || align=right | 2.6 km || 
|-id=760 bgcolor=#E9E9E9
| 215760 ||  || — || March 20, 2004 || Socorro || LINEAR || — || align=right | 4.1 km || 
|-id=761 bgcolor=#E9E9E9
| 215761 ||  || — || March 20, 2004 || Socorro || LINEAR || — || align=right | 2.2 km || 
|-id=762 bgcolor=#d6d6d6
| 215762 ||  || — || March 21, 2004 || Kitt Peak || Spacewatch || — || align=right | 3.5 km || 
|-id=763 bgcolor=#E9E9E9
| 215763 ||  || — || March 19, 2004 || Palomar || NEAT || — || align=right | 2.7 km || 
|-id=764 bgcolor=#E9E9E9
| 215764 ||  || — || March 26, 2004 || Kitt Peak || Spacewatch || — || align=right | 3.0 km || 
|-id=765 bgcolor=#E9E9E9
| 215765 ||  || — || March 23, 2004 || Socorro || LINEAR || — || align=right | 1.7 km || 
|-id=766 bgcolor=#E9E9E9
| 215766 ||  || — || March 27, 2004 || Socorro || LINEAR || — || align=right | 3.5 km || 
|-id=767 bgcolor=#E9E9E9
| 215767 ||  || — || March 27, 2004 || Socorro || LINEAR || DOR || align=right | 4.2 km || 
|-id=768 bgcolor=#E9E9E9
| 215768 ||  || — || March 23, 2004 || Kitt Peak || Spacewatch || — || align=right | 2.2 km || 
|-id=769 bgcolor=#E9E9E9
| 215769 ||  || — || April 12, 2004 || Catalina || CSS || PAL || align=right | 2.3 km || 
|-id=770 bgcolor=#E9E9E9
| 215770 ||  || — || April 10, 2004 || Palomar || NEAT || — || align=right | 3.9 km || 
|-id=771 bgcolor=#d6d6d6
| 215771 ||  || — || April 14, 2004 || Kitt Peak || Spacewatch || LIX || align=right | 4.6 km || 
|-id=772 bgcolor=#d6d6d6
| 215772 ||  || — || April 12, 2004 || Palomar || NEAT || EOS || align=right | 2.9 km || 
|-id=773 bgcolor=#E9E9E9
| 215773 ||  || — || April 9, 2004 || Siding Spring || SSS || — || align=right | 3.5 km || 
|-id=774 bgcolor=#E9E9E9
| 215774 ||  || — || April 12, 2004 || Palomar || NEAT || — || align=right | 4.4 km || 
|-id=775 bgcolor=#d6d6d6
| 215775 ||  || — || April 17, 2004 || Socorro || LINEAR || — || align=right | 4.5 km || 
|-id=776 bgcolor=#E9E9E9
| 215776 ||  || — || April 19, 2004 || Kitt Peak || Spacewatch || — || align=right | 2.3 km || 
|-id=777 bgcolor=#d6d6d6
| 215777 ||  || — || April 21, 2004 || Črni Vrh || Črni Vrh || BRA || align=right | 2.5 km || 
|-id=778 bgcolor=#d6d6d6
| 215778 ||  || — || April 25, 2004 || Haleakala || NEAT || BRA || align=right | 2.2 km || 
|-id=779 bgcolor=#d6d6d6
| 215779 ||  || — || April 19, 2004 || Kitt Peak || Spacewatch || — || align=right | 3.4 km || 
|-id=780 bgcolor=#d6d6d6
| 215780 ||  || — || April 22, 2004 || Kitt Peak || Spacewatch || BRA || align=right | 2.0 km || 
|-id=781 bgcolor=#d6d6d6
| 215781 ||  || — || April 28, 2004 || Kitt Peak || Spacewatch || — || align=right | 2.9 km || 
|-id=782 bgcolor=#fefefe
| 215782 ||  || — || May 13, 2004 || Socorro || LINEAR || H || align=right | 1.2 km || 
|-id=783 bgcolor=#d6d6d6
| 215783 ||  || — || May 15, 2004 || Socorro || LINEAR || TRP || align=right | 5.0 km || 
|-id=784 bgcolor=#fefefe
| 215784 ||  || — || May 14, 2004 || Kitt Peak || Spacewatch || — || align=right | 1.1 km || 
|-id=785 bgcolor=#E9E9E9
| 215785 ||  || — || May 21, 2004 || Catalina || CSS || — || align=right | 3.5 km || 
|-id=786 bgcolor=#d6d6d6
| 215786 ||  || — || May 23, 2004 || Kitt Peak || Spacewatch || — || align=right | 5.2 km || 
|-id=787 bgcolor=#d6d6d6
| 215787 ||  || — || June 9, 2004 || Catalina || CSS || — || align=right | 4.1 km || 
|-id=788 bgcolor=#E9E9E9
| 215788 ||  || — || June 12, 2004 || Socorro || LINEAR || — || align=right | 2.8 km || 
|-id=789 bgcolor=#d6d6d6
| 215789 ||  || — || June 13, 2004 || Palomar || NEAT || EOS || align=right | 3.5 km || 
|-id=790 bgcolor=#fefefe
| 215790 ||  || — || June 11, 2004 || Socorro || LINEAR || NYS || align=right | 2.3 km || 
|-id=791 bgcolor=#d6d6d6
| 215791 ||  || — || June 12, 2004 || Catalina || CSS || — || align=right | 2.8 km || 
|-id=792 bgcolor=#d6d6d6
| 215792 ||  || — || June 19, 2004 || Socorro || LINEAR || — || align=right | 5.3 km || 
|-id=793 bgcolor=#d6d6d6
| 215793 ||  || — || June 22, 2004 || Kitt Peak || Spacewatch || — || align=right | 5.8 km || 
|-id=794 bgcolor=#d6d6d6
| 215794 ||  || — || July 11, 2004 || Socorro || LINEAR || — || align=right | 3.6 km || 
|-id=795 bgcolor=#d6d6d6
| 215795 ||  || — || July 14, 2004 || Socorro || LINEAR || — || align=right | 3.3 km || 
|-id=796 bgcolor=#d6d6d6
| 215796 ||  || — || July 14, 2004 || Socorro || LINEAR || — || align=right | 5.2 km || 
|-id=797 bgcolor=#d6d6d6
| 215797 ||  || — || July 16, 2004 || Reedy Creek || J. Broughton || — || align=right | 5.4 km || 
|-id=798 bgcolor=#d6d6d6
| 215798 ||  || — || July 21, 2004 || Reedy Creek || J. Broughton || — || align=right | 5.3 km || 
|-id=799 bgcolor=#fefefe
| 215799 ||  || — || July 21, 2004 || Reedy Creek || J. Broughton || — || align=right | 1.2 km || 
|-id=800 bgcolor=#d6d6d6
| 215800 ||  || — || August 9, 2004 || Reedy Creek || J. Broughton || — || align=right | 5.6 km || 
|}

215801–215900 

|-bgcolor=#d6d6d6
| 215801 ||  || — || August 10, 2004 || Socorro || LINEAR || — || align=right | 4.5 km || 
|-id=802 bgcolor=#fefefe
| 215802 ||  || — || August 8, 2004 || Socorro || LINEAR || V || align=right | 1.2 km || 
|-id=803 bgcolor=#fefefe
| 215803 ||  || — || August 10, 2004 || Socorro || LINEAR || H || align=right data-sort-value="0.99" | 990 m || 
|-id=804 bgcolor=#d6d6d6
| 215804 ||  || — || August 16, 2004 || Siding Spring || SSS || — || align=right | 4.6 km || 
|-id=805 bgcolor=#fefefe
| 215805 ||  || — || September 8, 2004 || Uccle || T. Pauwels || MAS || align=right data-sort-value="0.86" | 860 m || 
|-id=806 bgcolor=#fefefe
| 215806 ||  || — || September 8, 2004 || Palomar || NEAT || PHO || align=right | 1.6 km || 
|-id=807 bgcolor=#d6d6d6
| 215807 ||  || — || September 8, 2004 || Socorro || LINEAR || — || align=right | 3.5 km || 
|-id=808 bgcolor=#fefefe
| 215808 ||  || — || September 10, 2004 || Kitt Peak || Spacewatch || V || align=right data-sort-value="0.92" | 920 m || 
|-id=809 bgcolor=#fefefe
| 215809 Hugoschwarz ||  ||  || September 14, 2004 || Uccle || P. De Cat || NYS || align=right data-sort-value="0.74" | 740 m || 
|-id=810 bgcolor=#E9E9E9
| 215810 ||  || — || September 9, 2004 || Kitt Peak || Spacewatch || — || align=right | 2.0 km || 
|-id=811 bgcolor=#d6d6d6
| 215811 ||  || — || September 13, 2004 || Socorro || LINEAR || — || align=right | 4.8 km || 
|-id=812 bgcolor=#d6d6d6
| 215812 ||  || — || October 9, 2004 || Anderson Mesa || LONEOS || HYG || align=right | 4.6 km || 
|-id=813 bgcolor=#fefefe
| 215813 ||  || — || October 7, 2004 || Kitt Peak || Spacewatch || — || align=right data-sort-value="0.80" | 800 m || 
|-id=814 bgcolor=#d6d6d6
| 215814 ||  || — || October 6, 2004 || Socorro || LINEAR || — || align=right | 5.3 km || 
|-id=815 bgcolor=#E9E9E9
| 215815 ||  || — || October 6, 2004 || Socorro || LINEAR || — || align=right | 2.9 km || 
|-id=816 bgcolor=#E9E9E9
| 215816 ||  || — || October 9, 2004 || Kitt Peak || Spacewatch || — || align=right | 2.3 km || 
|-id=817 bgcolor=#E9E9E9
| 215817 ||  || — || November 4, 2004 || Catalina || CSS || — || align=right | 2.5 km || 
|-id=818 bgcolor=#E9E9E9
| 215818 ||  || — || December 9, 2004 || Catalina || CSS || — || align=right | 2.1 km || 
|-id=819 bgcolor=#fefefe
| 215819 ||  || — || December 11, 2004 || Kitt Peak || Spacewatch || FLO || align=right data-sort-value="0.80" | 800 m || 
|-id=820 bgcolor=#E9E9E9
| 215820 ||  || — || December 9, 2004 || Goodricke-Pigott || Goodricke-Pigott Obs. || ADE || align=right | 2.5 km || 
|-id=821 bgcolor=#fefefe
| 215821 ||  || — || December 14, 2004 || Socorro || LINEAR || FLO || align=right data-sort-value="0.91" | 910 m || 
|-id=822 bgcolor=#C2FFFF
| 215822 ||  || — || December 10, 2004 || Kitt Peak || Spacewatch || L5 || align=right | 13 km || 
|-id=823 bgcolor=#fefefe
| 215823 ||  || — || January 8, 2005 || Campo Imperatore || CINEOS || — || align=right | 1.3 km || 
|-id=824 bgcolor=#fefefe
| 215824 ||  || — || January 11, 2005 || Socorro || LINEAR || — || align=right data-sort-value="0.83" | 830 m || 
|-id=825 bgcolor=#fefefe
| 215825 ||  || — || January 11, 2005 || Socorro || LINEAR || — || align=right | 1.0 km || 
|-id=826 bgcolor=#fefefe
| 215826 ||  || — || January 15, 2005 || Socorro || LINEAR || — || align=right data-sort-value="0.86" | 860 m || 
|-id=827 bgcolor=#fefefe
| 215827 ||  || — || January 13, 2005 || Kitt Peak || Spacewatch || — || align=right | 1.1 km || 
|-id=828 bgcolor=#fefefe
| 215828 ||  || — || January 13, 2005 || Kitt Peak || Spacewatch || — || align=right data-sort-value="0.93" | 930 m || 
|-id=829 bgcolor=#fefefe
| 215829 ||  || — || January 15, 2005 || Kitt Peak || Spacewatch || — || align=right data-sort-value="0.98" | 980 m || 
|-id=830 bgcolor=#fefefe
| 215830 ||  || — || January 16, 2005 || Socorro || LINEAR || — || align=right | 1.1 km || 
|-id=831 bgcolor=#E9E9E9
| 215831 ||  || — || January 16, 2005 || Kitt Peak || Spacewatch || — || align=right | 1.4 km || 
|-id=832 bgcolor=#fefefe
| 215832 ||  || — || January 31, 2005 || Mayhill || A. Lowe || — || align=right | 1.2 km || 
|-id=833 bgcolor=#fefefe
| 215833 ||  || — || February 1, 2005 || Kitt Peak || Spacewatch || FLO || align=right data-sort-value="0.99" | 990 m || 
|-id=834 bgcolor=#fefefe
| 215834 ||  || — || February 1, 2005 || Kitt Peak || Spacewatch || NYS || align=right data-sort-value="0.91" | 910 m || 
|-id=835 bgcolor=#E9E9E9
| 215835 ||  || — || February 2, 2005 || Socorro || LINEAR || WIT || align=right | 1.6 km || 
|-id=836 bgcolor=#fefefe
| 215836 ||  || — || February 2, 2005 || Catalina || CSS || — || align=right data-sort-value="0.96" | 960 m || 
|-id=837 bgcolor=#fefefe
| 215837 ||  || — || February 2, 2005 || Catalina || CSS || NYS || align=right data-sort-value="0.90" | 900 m || 
|-id=838 bgcolor=#fefefe
| 215838 ||  || — || February 1, 2005 || Catalina || CSS || — || align=right | 1.4 km || 
|-id=839 bgcolor=#fefefe
| 215839 ||  || — || February 1, 2005 || Kitt Peak || Spacewatch || FLO || align=right data-sort-value="0.84" | 840 m || 
|-id=840 bgcolor=#fefefe
| 215840 ||  || — || February 2, 2005 || Catalina || CSS || MAS || align=right data-sort-value="0.95" | 950 m || 
|-id=841 bgcolor=#fefefe
| 215841 Čimelice ||  ||  || February 6, 2005 || Klet || KLENOT || NYS || align=right data-sort-value="0.92" | 920 m || 
|-id=842 bgcolor=#E9E9E9
| 215842 ||  || — || February 2, 2005 || Kitt Peak || Spacewatch || HEN || align=right | 1.2 km || 
|-id=843 bgcolor=#fefefe
| 215843 ||  || — || February 2, 2005 || Catalina || CSS || FLO || align=right data-sort-value="0.78" | 780 m || 
|-id=844 bgcolor=#d6d6d6
| 215844 ||  || — || February 9, 2005 || Kitt Peak || Spacewatch || KOR || align=right | 2.4 km || 
|-id=845 bgcolor=#fefefe
| 215845 ||  || — || February 9, 2005 || Kitt Peak || Spacewatch || — || align=right | 1.1 km || 
|-id=846 bgcolor=#fefefe
| 215846 ||  || — || March 1, 2005 || Kitt Peak || Spacewatch || — || align=right | 1.3 km || 
|-id=847 bgcolor=#fefefe
| 215847 ||  || — || March 1, 2005 || Kitt Peak || Spacewatch || — || align=right | 1.0 km || 
|-id=848 bgcolor=#fefefe
| 215848 ||  || — || March 1, 2005 || Kitt Peak || Spacewatch || NYS || align=right | 2.4 km || 
|-id=849 bgcolor=#fefefe
| 215849 ||  || — || March 2, 2005 || Catalina || CSS || NYS || align=right data-sort-value="0.97" | 970 m || 
|-id=850 bgcolor=#fefefe
| 215850 ||  || — || March 3, 2005 || Kitt Peak || Spacewatch || NYS || align=right data-sort-value="0.82" | 820 m || 
|-id=851 bgcolor=#fefefe
| 215851 ||  || — || March 3, 2005 || Kitt Peak || Spacewatch || MAS || align=right data-sort-value="0.86" | 860 m || 
|-id=852 bgcolor=#fefefe
| 215852 ||  || — || March 3, 2005 || Catalina || CSS || MAS || align=right | 1.0 km || 
|-id=853 bgcolor=#fefefe
| 215853 ||  || — || March 3, 2005 || Catalina || CSS || NYS || align=right | 1.1 km || 
|-id=854 bgcolor=#fefefe
| 215854 ||  || — || March 2, 2005 || Catalina || CSS || — || align=right | 1.1 km || 
|-id=855 bgcolor=#fefefe
| 215855 ||  || — || March 4, 2005 || Catalina || CSS || — || align=right | 1.1 km || 
|-id=856 bgcolor=#fefefe
| 215856 ||  || — || March 3, 2005 || Catalina || CSS || — || align=right | 1.1 km || 
|-id=857 bgcolor=#fefefe
| 215857 ||  || — || March 4, 2005 || Kitt Peak || Spacewatch || MAS || align=right | 1.0 km || 
|-id=858 bgcolor=#fefefe
| 215858 ||  || — || March 4, 2005 || Kitt Peak || Spacewatch || MAS || align=right | 1.00 km || 
|-id=859 bgcolor=#E9E9E9
| 215859 ||  || — || March 4, 2005 || Socorro || LINEAR || — || align=right | 2.1 km || 
|-id=860 bgcolor=#fefefe
| 215860 ||  || — || March 2, 2005 || Catalina || CSS || — || align=right | 1.2 km || 
|-id=861 bgcolor=#fefefe
| 215861 ||  || — || March 3, 2005 || Catalina || CSS || KLI || align=right | 3.1 km || 
|-id=862 bgcolor=#fefefe
| 215862 ||  || — || March 4, 2005 || Socorro || LINEAR || V || align=right | 1.0 km || 
|-id=863 bgcolor=#fefefe
| 215863 ||  || — || March 9, 2005 || Socorro || LINEAR || NYS || align=right data-sort-value="0.77" | 770 m || 
|-id=864 bgcolor=#fefefe
| 215864 ||  || — || March 10, 2005 || Catalina || CSS || — || align=right | 1.3 km || 
|-id=865 bgcolor=#d6d6d6
| 215865 ||  || — || March 10, 2005 || Mount Lemmon || Mount Lemmon Survey || — || align=right | 3.8 km || 
|-id=866 bgcolor=#fefefe
| 215866 ||  || — || March 10, 2005 || Mount Lemmon || Mount Lemmon Survey || — || align=right | 1.3 km || 
|-id=867 bgcolor=#fefefe
| 215867 ||  || — || March 10, 2005 || Kitt Peak || Spacewatch || — || align=right | 1.2 km || 
|-id=868 bgcolor=#fefefe
| 215868 Rohrer ||  ||  || March 12, 2005 || Gnosca || S. Sposetti || — || align=right | 1.1 km || 
|-id=869 bgcolor=#E9E9E9
| 215869 ||  || — || March 9, 2005 || Anderson Mesa || LONEOS || — || align=right | 1.4 km || 
|-id=870 bgcolor=#fefefe
| 215870 ||  || — || March 9, 2005 || Mount Lemmon || Mount Lemmon Survey || MAS || align=right data-sort-value="0.87" | 870 m || 
|-id=871 bgcolor=#fefefe
| 215871 ||  || — || March 11, 2005 || Kitt Peak || Spacewatch || MAS || align=right data-sort-value="0.86" | 860 m || 
|-id=872 bgcolor=#fefefe
| 215872 ||  || — || March 8, 2005 || Mount Lemmon || Mount Lemmon Survey || MAS || align=right data-sort-value="0.76" | 760 m || 
|-id=873 bgcolor=#fefefe
| 215873 ||  || — || March 9, 2005 || Mount Lemmon || Mount Lemmon Survey || MAS || align=right data-sort-value="0.80" | 800 m || 
|-id=874 bgcolor=#fefefe
| 215874 ||  || — || March 11, 2005 || Mount Lemmon || Mount Lemmon Survey || NYS || align=right data-sort-value="0.79" | 790 m || 
|-id=875 bgcolor=#fefefe
| 215875 ||  || — || March 11, 2005 || Mount Lemmon || Mount Lemmon Survey || — || align=right | 1.0 km || 
|-id=876 bgcolor=#fefefe
| 215876 ||  || — || March 9, 2005 || Socorro || LINEAR || — || align=right | 1.2 km || 
|-id=877 bgcolor=#E9E9E9
| 215877 ||  || — || March 10, 2005 || Anderson Mesa || LONEOS || MIT || align=right | 2.4 km || 
|-id=878 bgcolor=#fefefe
| 215878 ||  || — || March 10, 2005 || Mount Lemmon || Mount Lemmon Survey || FLO || align=right data-sort-value="0.94" | 940 m || 
|-id=879 bgcolor=#fefefe
| 215879 ||  || — || March 10, 2005 || Catalina || CSS || — || align=right | 1.1 km || 
|-id=880 bgcolor=#fefefe
| 215880 ||  || — || March 11, 2005 || Mount Lemmon || Mount Lemmon Survey || — || align=right | 1.3 km || 
|-id=881 bgcolor=#fefefe
| 215881 ||  || — || March 11, 2005 || Kitt Peak || Spacewatch || MAS || align=right data-sort-value="0.95" | 950 m || 
|-id=882 bgcolor=#fefefe
| 215882 ||  || — || March 11, 2005 || Kitt Peak || Spacewatch || MAS || align=right data-sort-value="0.88" | 880 m || 
|-id=883 bgcolor=#fefefe
| 215883 ||  || — || March 13, 2005 || Kitt Peak || Spacewatch || — || align=right | 1.2 km || 
|-id=884 bgcolor=#fefefe
| 215884 ||  || — || March 9, 2005 || Kitt Peak || M. W. Buie || — || align=right | 1.1 km || 
|-id=885 bgcolor=#fefefe
| 215885 ||  || — || March 4, 2005 || Mount Lemmon || Mount Lemmon Survey || — || align=right | 1.2 km || 
|-id=886 bgcolor=#fefefe
| 215886 Barryarnold ||  ||  || March 16, 2005 || Saint-Sulpice || B. Christophe || — || align=right data-sort-value="0.91" | 910 m || 
|-id=887 bgcolor=#fefefe
| 215887 ||  || — || April 1, 2005 || Kitt Peak || Spacewatch || NYS || align=right data-sort-value="0.71" | 710 m || 
|-id=888 bgcolor=#fefefe
| 215888 ||  || — || April 1, 2005 || Kitt Peak || Spacewatch || V || align=right | 1.1 km || 
|-id=889 bgcolor=#fefefe
| 215889 ||  || — || April 1, 2005 || Kitt Peak || Spacewatch || — || align=right | 1.2 km || 
|-id=890 bgcolor=#fefefe
| 215890 ||  || — || April 2, 2005 || Mount Lemmon || Mount Lemmon Survey || MAS || align=right data-sort-value="0.79" | 790 m || 
|-id=891 bgcolor=#fefefe
| 215891 ||  || — || April 2, 2005 || Mount Lemmon || Mount Lemmon Survey || NYS || align=right data-sort-value="0.66" | 660 m || 
|-id=892 bgcolor=#fefefe
| 215892 ||  || — || April 4, 2005 || Catalina || CSS || — || align=right data-sort-value="0.99" | 990 m || 
|-id=893 bgcolor=#fefefe
| 215893 ||  || — || April 5, 2005 || Mount Lemmon || Mount Lemmon Survey || V || align=right data-sort-value="0.79" | 790 m || 
|-id=894 bgcolor=#fefefe
| 215894 ||  || — || April 2, 2005 || Mount Lemmon || Mount Lemmon Survey || — || align=right data-sort-value="0.77" | 770 m || 
|-id=895 bgcolor=#E9E9E9
| 215895 ||  || — || April 5, 2005 || Mount Lemmon || Mount Lemmon Survey || — || align=right | 1.0 km || 
|-id=896 bgcolor=#fefefe
| 215896 ||  || — || April 4, 2005 || Catalina || CSS || — || align=right | 1.2 km || 
|-id=897 bgcolor=#E9E9E9
| 215897 ||  || — || April 2, 2005 || Mount Lemmon || Mount Lemmon Survey || — || align=right data-sort-value="0.82" | 820 m || 
|-id=898 bgcolor=#fefefe
| 215898 ||  || — || April 3, 2005 || Palomar || NEAT || — || align=right | 2.9 km || 
|-id=899 bgcolor=#fefefe
| 215899 ||  || — || April 10, 2005 || Mount Lemmon || Spacewatch || — || align=right data-sort-value="0.86" | 860 m || 
|-id=900 bgcolor=#fefefe
| 215900 ||  || — || April 9, 2005 || Catalina || CSS || — || align=right | 3.8 km || 
|}

215901–216000 

|-bgcolor=#fefefe
| 215901 ||  || — || April 7, 2005 || Kitt Peak || Spacewatch || V || align=right data-sort-value="0.96" | 960 m || 
|-id=902 bgcolor=#E9E9E9
| 215902 ||  || — || April 12, 2005 || Kitt Peak || Spacewatch || — || align=right | 3.5 km || 
|-id=903 bgcolor=#fefefe
| 215903 ||  || — || April 12, 2005 || Kitt Peak || Spacewatch || NYS || align=right data-sort-value="0.91" | 910 m || 
|-id=904 bgcolor=#fefefe
| 215904 ||  || — || April 12, 2005 || Kitt Peak || Spacewatch || MAS || align=right | 1.1 km || 
|-id=905 bgcolor=#fefefe
| 215905 ||  || — || April 10, 2005 || Kitt Peak || M. W. Buie || NYS || align=right data-sort-value="0.90" | 900 m || 
|-id=906 bgcolor=#E9E9E9
| 215906 ||  || — || April 14, 2005 || Catalina || CSS || — || align=right | 1.3 km || 
|-id=907 bgcolor=#fefefe
| 215907 ||  || — || April 27, 2005 || Cordell-Lorenz || D. T. Durig || V || align=right | 1.2 km || 
|-id=908 bgcolor=#E9E9E9
| 215908 ||  || — || April 30, 2005 || Kitt Peak || Spacewatch || — || align=right | 1.2 km || 
|-id=909 bgcolor=#fefefe
| 215909 ||  || — || May 4, 2005 || Mauna Kea || C. Veillet || — || align=right | 1.8 km || 
|-id=910 bgcolor=#E9E9E9
| 215910 ||  || — || May 4, 2005 || Catalina || CSS || — || align=right | 2.0 km || 
|-id=911 bgcolor=#fefefe
| 215911 ||  || — || May 6, 2005 || Catalina || CSS || V || align=right data-sort-value="0.94" | 940 m || 
|-id=912 bgcolor=#E9E9E9
| 215912 ||  || — || May 4, 2005 || Kitt Peak || Spacewatch || — || align=right | 1.5 km || 
|-id=913 bgcolor=#E9E9E9
| 215913 ||  || — || May 4, 2005 || Palomar || NEAT || — || align=right | 1.5 km || 
|-id=914 bgcolor=#E9E9E9
| 215914 ||  || — || May 4, 2005 || Palomar || NEAT || — || align=right | 1.1 km || 
|-id=915 bgcolor=#E9E9E9
| 215915 ||  || — || May 7, 2005 || Kitt Peak || Spacewatch || — || align=right | 1.8 km || 
|-id=916 bgcolor=#fefefe
| 215916 ||  || — || May 3, 2005 || Kitt Peak || Spacewatch || — || align=right | 1.3 km || 
|-id=917 bgcolor=#fefefe
| 215917 ||  || — || May 6, 2005 || Mount Lemmon || Mount Lemmon Survey || MAS || align=right data-sort-value="0.76" | 760 m || 
|-id=918 bgcolor=#E9E9E9
| 215918 ||  || — || May 6, 2005 || Kitt Peak || Spacewatch || — || align=right | 2.5 km || 
|-id=919 bgcolor=#E9E9E9
| 215919 ||  || — || May 7, 2005 || Catalina || CSS || EUN || align=right | 1.6 km || 
|-id=920 bgcolor=#E9E9E9
| 215920 ||  || — || May 8, 2005 || Mount Lemmon || Mount Lemmon Survey || — || align=right | 2.0 km || 
|-id=921 bgcolor=#E9E9E9
| 215921 ||  || — || May 8, 2005 || Anderson Mesa || LONEOS || — || align=right | 3.1 km || 
|-id=922 bgcolor=#E9E9E9
| 215922 ||  || — || May 9, 2005 || Kitt Peak || Spacewatch || — || align=right | 1.9 km || 
|-id=923 bgcolor=#E9E9E9
| 215923 ||  || — || May 10, 2005 || Kitt Peak || Spacewatch || — || align=right | 1.5 km || 
|-id=924 bgcolor=#E9E9E9
| 215924 ||  || — || May 11, 2005 || Kitt Peak || Spacewatch || — || align=right data-sort-value="0.87" | 870 m || 
|-id=925 bgcolor=#E9E9E9
| 215925 ||  || — || May 12, 2005 || Mount Lemmon || Mount Lemmon Survey || — || align=right | 1.5 km || 
|-id=926 bgcolor=#E9E9E9
| 215926 ||  || — || May 12, 2005 || Catalina || CSS || — || align=right | 2.6 km || 
|-id=927 bgcolor=#E9E9E9
| 215927 ||  || — || May 12, 2005 || Socorro || LINEAR || — || align=right | 1.6 km || 
|-id=928 bgcolor=#fefefe
| 215928 ||  || — || May 4, 2005 || Palomar || NEAT || — || align=right data-sort-value="0.99" | 990 m || 
|-id=929 bgcolor=#fefefe
| 215929 ||  || — || May 4, 2005 || Catalina || CSS || V || align=right | 1.0 km || 
|-id=930 bgcolor=#E9E9E9
| 215930 ||  || — || May 8, 2005 || Kitt Peak || Spacewatch || EUN || align=right | 1.4 km || 
|-id=931 bgcolor=#fefefe
| 215931 ||  || — || May 17, 2005 || Mount Lemmon || Mount Lemmon Survey || — || align=right | 1.1 km || 
|-id=932 bgcolor=#E9E9E9
| 215932 ||  || — || May 18, 2005 || Palomar || NEAT || — || align=right | 2.0 km || 
|-id=933 bgcolor=#E9E9E9
| 215933 ||  || — || May 16, 2005 || Kitt Peak || Spacewatch || JUN || align=right | 2.9 km || 
|-id=934 bgcolor=#E9E9E9
| 215934 ||  || — || May 19, 2005 || Mount Lemmon || Mount Lemmon Survey || — || align=right | 2.3 km || 
|-id=935 bgcolor=#E9E9E9
| 215935 ||  || — || May 19, 2005 || Mount Lemmon || Mount Lemmon Survey || — || align=right | 1.3 km || 
|-id=936 bgcolor=#E9E9E9
| 215936 ||  || — || May 30, 2005 || Junk Bond || Junk Bond Obs. || — || align=right | 4.5 km || 
|-id=937 bgcolor=#E9E9E9
| 215937 ||  || — || May 31, 2005 || Reedy Creek || J. Broughton || — || align=right | 3.7 km || 
|-id=938 bgcolor=#E9E9E9
| 215938 ||  || — || June 1, 2005 || Kitt Peak || Spacewatch || — || align=right | 2.0 km || 
|-id=939 bgcolor=#E9E9E9
| 215939 ||  || — || June 2, 2005 || Siding Spring || SSS || — || align=right | 2.4 km || 
|-id=940 bgcolor=#E9E9E9
| 215940 ||  || — || June 2, 2005 || Siding Spring || SSS || — || align=right | 2.8 km || 
|-id=941 bgcolor=#E9E9E9
| 215941 ||  || — || June 4, 2005 || Kitt Peak || Spacewatch || — || align=right | 1.3 km || 
|-id=942 bgcolor=#E9E9E9
| 215942 ||  || — || June 8, 2005 || Kitt Peak || Spacewatch || — || align=right | 1.3 km || 
|-id=943 bgcolor=#E9E9E9
| 215943 ||  || — || June 24, 2005 || Palomar || NEAT || — || align=right | 1.6 km || 
|-id=944 bgcolor=#E9E9E9
| 215944 ||  || — || June 27, 2005 || Kitt Peak || Spacewatch || — || align=right | 1.8 km || 
|-id=945 bgcolor=#d6d6d6
| 215945 ||  || — || June 29, 2005 || Palomar || NEAT || CHA || align=right | 2.9 km || 
|-id=946 bgcolor=#E9E9E9
| 215946 ||  || — || June 30, 2005 || Catalina || CSS || — || align=right | 4.8 km || 
|-id=947 bgcolor=#d6d6d6
| 215947 ||  || — || June 30, 2005 || Kitt Peak || Spacewatch || — || align=right | 5.6 km || 
|-id=948 bgcolor=#E9E9E9
| 215948 ||  || — || June 30, 2005 || Kitt Peak || Spacewatch || — || align=right | 2.7 km || 
|-id=949 bgcolor=#E9E9E9
| 215949 ||  || — || June 21, 2005 || Palomar || NEAT || — || align=right | 3.9 km || 
|-id=950 bgcolor=#E9E9E9
| 215950 ||  || — || July 4, 2005 || Mount Lemmon || Mount Lemmon Survey || — || align=right | 2.7 km || 
|-id=951 bgcolor=#E9E9E9
| 215951 ||  || — || July 4, 2005 || Palomar || NEAT || — || align=right | 1.3 km || 
|-id=952 bgcolor=#E9E9E9
| 215952 ||  || — || July 5, 2005 || Palomar || NEAT || AGN || align=right | 1.7 km || 
|-id=953 bgcolor=#E9E9E9
| 215953 ||  || — || July 4, 2005 || Palomar || NEAT || AEO || align=right | 1.6 km || 
|-id=954 bgcolor=#E9E9E9
| 215954 ||  || — || July 5, 2005 || Catalina || CSS || JUN || align=right | 1.8 km || 
|-id=955 bgcolor=#E9E9E9
| 215955 ||  || — || July 6, 2005 || Reedy Creek || J. Broughton || — || align=right | 2.6 km || 
|-id=956 bgcolor=#E9E9E9
| 215956 ||  || — || July 3, 2005 || Mount Lemmon || Mount Lemmon Survey || — || align=right | 3.1 km || 
|-id=957 bgcolor=#E9E9E9
| 215957 ||  || — || July 11, 2005 || Mayhill || A. Lowe || JUN || align=right | 1.6 km || 
|-id=958 bgcolor=#d6d6d6
| 215958 ||  || — || July 5, 2005 || Kitt Peak || Spacewatch || KOR || align=right | 1.7 km || 
|-id=959 bgcolor=#E9E9E9
| 215959 ||  || — || July 6, 2005 || Siding Spring || SSS || GEF || align=right | 1.7 km || 
|-id=960 bgcolor=#d6d6d6
| 215960 ||  || — || July 9, 2005 || Kitt Peak || Spacewatch || EOS || align=right | 2.6 km || 
|-id=961 bgcolor=#fefefe
| 215961 ||  || — || July 10, 2005 || Siding Spring || SSS || V || align=right data-sort-value="0.98" | 980 m || 
|-id=962 bgcolor=#E9E9E9
| 215962 ||  || — || August 1, 2005 || Campo Imperatore || CINEOS || MRX || align=right | 1.4 km || 
|-id=963 bgcolor=#d6d6d6
| 215963 ||  || — || August 11, 2005 || Reedy Creek || J. Broughton || BRA || align=right | 2.3 km || 
|-id=964 bgcolor=#d6d6d6
| 215964 ||  || — || August 24, 2005 || Palomar || NEAT || — || align=right | 3.4 km || 
|-id=965 bgcolor=#fefefe
| 215965 ||  || — || August 24, 2005 || Palomar || NEAT || NYS || align=right data-sort-value="0.99" | 990 m || 
|-id=966 bgcolor=#d6d6d6
| 215966 ||  || — || August 25, 2005 || Palomar || NEAT || — || align=right | 5.5 km || 
|-id=967 bgcolor=#d6d6d6
| 215967 ||  || — || August 26, 2005 || Palomar || NEAT || EOS || align=right | 2.6 km || 
|-id=968 bgcolor=#d6d6d6
| 215968 ||  || — || August 28, 2005 || Kitt Peak || Spacewatch || THM || align=right | 3.3 km || 
|-id=969 bgcolor=#d6d6d6
| 215969 ||  || — || August 28, 2005 || Kitt Peak || Spacewatch || — || align=right | 3.4 km || 
|-id=970 bgcolor=#E9E9E9
| 215970 ||  || — || August 28, 2005 || Campo Catino || CAOS || GEF || align=right | 2.2 km || 
|-id=971 bgcolor=#d6d6d6
| 215971 ||  || — || August 28, 2005 || Siding Spring || SSS || HYG || align=right | 3.7 km || 
|-id=972 bgcolor=#d6d6d6
| 215972 ||  || — || August 25, 2005 || Palomar || NEAT || — || align=right | 4.1 km || 
|-id=973 bgcolor=#E9E9E9
| 215973 ||  || — || August 27, 2005 || Palomar || NEAT || — || align=right | 3.6 km || 
|-id=974 bgcolor=#d6d6d6
| 215974 ||  || — || August 27, 2005 || Palomar || NEAT || HYG || align=right | 3.4 km || 
|-id=975 bgcolor=#d6d6d6
| 215975 ||  || — || August 27, 2005 || Palomar || NEAT || — || align=right | 3.8 km || 
|-id=976 bgcolor=#E9E9E9
| 215976 ||  || — || August 28, 2005 || Kitt Peak || Spacewatch || — || align=right | 2.8 km || 
|-id=977 bgcolor=#d6d6d6
| 215977 ||  || — || August 28, 2005 || Siding Spring || SSS || EOS || align=right | 3.2 km || 
|-id=978 bgcolor=#d6d6d6
| 215978 ||  || — || August 26, 2005 || Palomar || NEAT || CHA || align=right | 3.3 km || 
|-id=979 bgcolor=#d6d6d6
| 215979 ||  || — || September 10, 2005 || Anderson Mesa || LONEOS || — || align=right | 4.9 km || 
|-id=980 bgcolor=#d6d6d6
| 215980 ||  || — || September 10, 2005 || Anderson Mesa || LONEOS || — || align=right | 3.4 km || 
|-id=981 bgcolor=#d6d6d6
| 215981 ||  || — || September 8, 2005 || Socorro || LINEAR || — || align=right | 2.9 km || 
|-id=982 bgcolor=#d6d6d6
| 215982 ||  || — || September 23, 2005 || Kitt Peak || Spacewatch || — || align=right | 4.8 km || 
|-id=983 bgcolor=#d6d6d6
| 215983 ||  || — || September 23, 2005 || Kitt Peak || Spacewatch || EOS || align=right | 2.5 km || 
|-id=984 bgcolor=#d6d6d6
| 215984 ||  || — || September 24, 2005 || Kitt Peak || Spacewatch || — || align=right | 5.2 km || 
|-id=985 bgcolor=#d6d6d6
| 215985 ||  || — || September 24, 2005 || Kitt Peak || Spacewatch || — || align=right | 4.7 km || 
|-id=986 bgcolor=#E9E9E9
| 215986 ||  || — || September 24, 2005 || Kitt Peak || Spacewatch || — || align=right | 2.6 km || 
|-id=987 bgcolor=#d6d6d6
| 215987 ||  || — || September 26, 2005 || Kitt Peak || Spacewatch || — || align=right | 4.6 km || 
|-id=988 bgcolor=#d6d6d6
| 215988 ||  || — || September 26, 2005 || Palomar || NEAT || — || align=right | 4.7 km || 
|-id=989 bgcolor=#d6d6d6
| 215989 ||  || — || September 24, 2005 || Kitt Peak || Spacewatch || — || align=right | 5.3 km || 
|-id=990 bgcolor=#d6d6d6
| 215990 ||  || — || September 28, 2005 || Palomar || NEAT || TIR || align=right | 2.5 km || 
|-id=991 bgcolor=#d6d6d6
| 215991 ||  || — || September 29, 2005 || Palomar || NEAT || — || align=right | 3.8 km || 
|-id=992 bgcolor=#d6d6d6
| 215992 ||  || — || September 29, 2005 || Mount Lemmon || Mount Lemmon Survey || THM || align=right | 2.7 km || 
|-id=993 bgcolor=#d6d6d6
| 215993 ||  || — || September 27, 2005 || Palomar || NEAT || — || align=right | 4.3 km || 
|-id=994 bgcolor=#d6d6d6
| 215994 ||  || — || September 28, 2005 || Palomar || NEAT || — || align=right | 4.1 km || 
|-id=995 bgcolor=#d6d6d6
| 215995 ||  || — || September 29, 2005 || Anderson Mesa || LONEOS || EOS || align=right | 2.5 km || 
|-id=996 bgcolor=#d6d6d6
| 215996 ||  || — || September 29, 2005 || Mount Lemmon || Mount Lemmon Survey || — || align=right | 3.0 km || 
|-id=997 bgcolor=#d6d6d6
| 215997 ||  || — || September 30, 2005 || Mount Lemmon || Mount Lemmon Survey || — || align=right | 3.3 km || 
|-id=998 bgcolor=#d6d6d6
| 215998 ||  || — || September 30, 2005 || Kitt Peak || Spacewatch || — || align=right | 4.2 km || 
|-id=999 bgcolor=#d6d6d6
| 215999 ||  || — || September 30, 2005 || Palomar || NEAT || 7:4 || align=right | 4.8 km || 
|-id=000 bgcolor=#d6d6d6
| 216000 ||  || — || September 23, 2005 || Kitt Peak || Spacewatch || THM || align=right | 3.4 km || 
|}

References

External links 
 Discovery Circumstances: Numbered Minor Planets (215001)–(220000) (IAU Minor Planet Center)

0215